

275001–275100 

|-bgcolor=#d6d6d6
| 275001 ||  || — || October 15, 2009 || Catalina || CSS || — || align=right | 4.7 km || 
|-id=002 bgcolor=#fefefe
| 275002 ||  || — || October 11, 2009 || La Sagra || OAM Obs. || — || align=right | 2.1 km || 
|-id=003 bgcolor=#fefefe
| 275003 ||  || — || October 14, 2009 || Catalina || CSS || — || align=right data-sort-value="0.78" | 780 m || 
|-id=004 bgcolor=#fefefe
| 275004 ||  || — || October 14, 2009 || Catalina || CSS || NYS || align=right data-sort-value="0.80" | 800 m || 
|-id=005 bgcolor=#d6d6d6
| 275005 ||  || — || October 15, 2009 || Catalina || CSS || — || align=right | 4.9 km || 
|-id=006 bgcolor=#C2FFFF
| 275006 ||  || — || October 15, 2009 || La Sagra || OAM Obs. || L4 || align=right | 14 km || 
|-id=007 bgcolor=#C2FFFF
| 275007 ||  || — || October 13, 2009 || Bergisch Gladbach || W. Bickel || L4 || align=right | 11 km || 
|-id=008 bgcolor=#E9E9E9
| 275008 ||  || — || October 14, 2009 || Catalina || CSS || — || align=right | 3.0 km || 
|-id=009 bgcolor=#E9E9E9
| 275009 ||  || — || October 17, 2009 || Črni Vrh || Črni Vrh || — || align=right | 1.9 km || 
|-id=010 bgcolor=#E9E9E9
| 275010 ||  || — || October 18, 2009 || Bisei SG Center || BATTeRS || — || align=right | 1.7 km || 
|-id=011 bgcolor=#E9E9E9
| 275011 ||  || — || October 17, 2009 || Bisei SG Center || BATTeRS || — || align=right | 2.1 km || 
|-id=012 bgcolor=#d6d6d6
| 275012 ||  || — || December 2, 1994 || Kitt Peak || Spacewatch || SHU3:2 || align=right | 6.6 km || 
|-id=013 bgcolor=#E9E9E9
| 275013 ||  || — || October 16, 2009 || Mount Lemmon || Mount Lemmon Survey || AST || align=right | 2.0 km || 
|-id=014 bgcolor=#d6d6d6
| 275014 ||  || — || October 16, 2009 || Catalina || CSS || EOS || align=right | 3.1 km || 
|-id=015 bgcolor=#d6d6d6
| 275015 ||  || — || October 17, 2009 || Kitt Peak || Spacewatch || HYG || align=right | 3.3 km || 
|-id=016 bgcolor=#d6d6d6
| 275016 ||  || — || October 17, 2009 || La Sagra || OAM Obs. || — || align=right | 3.5 km || 
|-id=017 bgcolor=#E9E9E9
| 275017 ||  || — || October 17, 2009 || Mount Lemmon || Mount Lemmon Survey || — || align=right | 3.5 km || 
|-id=018 bgcolor=#fefefe
| 275018 ||  || — || October 21, 2009 || Mount Lemmon || Mount Lemmon Survey || FLO || align=right data-sort-value="0.59" | 590 m || 
|-id=019 bgcolor=#d6d6d6
| 275019 ||  || — || October 21, 2009 || Catalina || CSS || — || align=right | 5.0 km || 
|-id=020 bgcolor=#fefefe
| 275020 ||  || — || October 21, 2009 || Catalina || CSS || NYS || align=right data-sort-value="0.84" | 840 m || 
|-id=021 bgcolor=#d6d6d6
| 275021 ||  || — || October 18, 2009 || Mount Lemmon || Mount Lemmon Survey || THB || align=right | 4.5 km || 
|-id=022 bgcolor=#d6d6d6
| 275022 ||  || — || October 18, 2009 || Mount Lemmon || Mount Lemmon Survey || TIR || align=right | 2.2 km || 
|-id=023 bgcolor=#d6d6d6
| 275023 ||  || — || October 18, 2009 || Mount Lemmon || Mount Lemmon Survey || THM || align=right | 2.2 km || 
|-id=024 bgcolor=#fefefe
| 275024 ||  || — || October 18, 2009 || Mount Lemmon || Mount Lemmon Survey || MAS || align=right data-sort-value="0.91" | 910 m || 
|-id=025 bgcolor=#d6d6d6
| 275025 ||  || — || October 18, 2009 || Mount Lemmon || Mount Lemmon Survey || — || align=right | 2.5 km || 
|-id=026 bgcolor=#E9E9E9
| 275026 ||  || — || October 18, 2009 || Mount Lemmon || Mount Lemmon Survey || — || align=right | 1.7 km || 
|-id=027 bgcolor=#E9E9E9
| 275027 ||  || — || October 21, 2009 || Mount Lemmon || Mount Lemmon Survey || RAF || align=right data-sort-value="0.96" | 960 m || 
|-id=028 bgcolor=#d6d6d6
| 275028 ||  || — || October 21, 2009 || Mount Lemmon || Mount Lemmon Survey || — || align=right | 2.6 km || 
|-id=029 bgcolor=#d6d6d6
| 275029 ||  || — || November 21, 2004 || Campo Imperatore || CINEOS || — || align=right | 4.2 km || 
|-id=030 bgcolor=#E9E9E9
| 275030 ||  || — || October 22, 2009 || Mount Lemmon || Mount Lemmon Survey || — || align=right | 1.2 km || 
|-id=031 bgcolor=#d6d6d6
| 275031 ||  || — || October 22, 2009 || Mount Lemmon || Mount Lemmon Survey || 3:2 || align=right | 6.8 km || 
|-id=032 bgcolor=#E9E9E9
| 275032 ||  || — || October 18, 2009 || Mount Lemmon || Mount Lemmon Survey || — || align=right | 3.1 km || 
|-id=033 bgcolor=#E9E9E9
| 275033 ||  || — || October 18, 2009 || Mount Lemmon || Mount Lemmon Survey || AST || align=right | 1.8 km || 
|-id=034 bgcolor=#fefefe
| 275034 ||  || — || October 18, 2009 || Mount Lemmon || Mount Lemmon Survey || V || align=right data-sort-value="0.81" | 810 m || 
|-id=035 bgcolor=#E9E9E9
| 275035 ||  || — || August 22, 2004 || Kitt Peak || Spacewatch || — || align=right | 1.7 km || 
|-id=036 bgcolor=#d6d6d6
| 275036 ||  || — || October 18, 2009 || Mount Lemmon || Mount Lemmon Survey || — || align=right | 3.8 km || 
|-id=037 bgcolor=#d6d6d6
| 275037 ||  || — || December 25, 2005 || Kitt Peak || Spacewatch || KOR || align=right | 1.3 km || 
|-id=038 bgcolor=#E9E9E9
| 275038 ||  || — || October 27, 2005 || Kitt Peak || Spacewatch || — || align=right | 2.3 km || 
|-id=039 bgcolor=#fefefe
| 275039 ||  || — || October 23, 2009 || Mount Lemmon || Mount Lemmon Survey || — || align=right | 1.2 km || 
|-id=040 bgcolor=#E9E9E9
| 275040 ||  || — || October 17, 2009 || Mount Lemmon || Mount Lemmon Survey || AGN || align=right | 1.5 km || 
|-id=041 bgcolor=#E9E9E9
| 275041 ||  || — || October 17, 2009 || Mount Lemmon || Mount Lemmon Survey || NEM || align=right | 2.6 km || 
|-id=042 bgcolor=#E9E9E9
| 275042 ||  || — || October 17, 2009 || Mount Lemmon || Mount Lemmon Survey || HNS || align=right | 1.5 km || 
|-id=043 bgcolor=#fefefe
| 275043 ||  || — || October 22, 2009 || Mount Lemmon || Mount Lemmon Survey || — || align=right data-sort-value="0.84" | 840 m || 
|-id=044 bgcolor=#fefefe
| 275044 ||  || — || October 22, 2009 || Catalina || CSS || V || align=right data-sort-value="0.83" | 830 m || 
|-id=045 bgcolor=#E9E9E9
| 275045 ||  || — || October 21, 2009 || Mount Lemmon || Mount Lemmon Survey || NEM || align=right | 2.1 km || 
|-id=046 bgcolor=#E9E9E9
| 275046 ||  || — || October 22, 2009 || Catalina || CSS || MRX || align=right | 1.4 km || 
|-id=047 bgcolor=#E9E9E9
| 275047 ||  || — || October 23, 2009 || Mount Lemmon || Mount Lemmon Survey || — || align=right | 2.7 km || 
|-id=048 bgcolor=#E9E9E9
| 275048 ||  || — || October 24, 2009 || Catalina || CSS || — || align=right | 1.2 km || 
|-id=049 bgcolor=#fefefe
| 275049 ||  || — || October 18, 2009 || Mount Lemmon || Mount Lemmon Survey || — || align=right | 1.0 km || 
|-id=050 bgcolor=#E9E9E9
| 275050 ||  || — || October 18, 2009 || Catalina || CSS || — || align=right | 2.0 km || 
|-id=051 bgcolor=#d6d6d6
| 275051 ||  || — || October 25, 2009 || Tiki || N. Teamo || EOS || align=right | 2.0 km || 
|-id=052 bgcolor=#fefefe
| 275052 ||  || — || October 23, 2009 || Mount Lemmon || Mount Lemmon Survey || NYS || align=right | 1.8 km || 
|-id=053 bgcolor=#fefefe
| 275053 ||  || — || October 23, 2009 || Mount Lemmon || Mount Lemmon Survey || NYS || align=right data-sort-value="0.58" | 580 m || 
|-id=054 bgcolor=#E9E9E9
| 275054 ||  || — || October 22, 2009 || Mount Lemmon || Mount Lemmon Survey || — || align=right | 2.1 km || 
|-id=055 bgcolor=#E9E9E9
| 275055 ||  || — || October 23, 2009 || Kitt Peak || Spacewatch || — || align=right | 2.4 km || 
|-id=056 bgcolor=#E9E9E9
| 275056 ||  || — || October 23, 2009 || Mount Lemmon || Mount Lemmon Survey || — || align=right | 1.3 km || 
|-id=057 bgcolor=#d6d6d6
| 275057 ||  || — || October 23, 2009 || Mount Lemmon || Mount Lemmon Survey || — || align=right | 3.6 km || 
|-id=058 bgcolor=#d6d6d6
| 275058 ||  || — || October 23, 2009 || Kitt Peak || Spacewatch || KAR || align=right | 1.2 km || 
|-id=059 bgcolor=#C2FFFF
| 275059 ||  || — || October 22, 2009 || Mount Lemmon || Mount Lemmon Survey || L4 || align=right | 11 km || 
|-id=060 bgcolor=#d6d6d6
| 275060 ||  || — || October 22, 2009 || Catalina || CSS || — || align=right | 3.6 km || 
|-id=061 bgcolor=#E9E9E9
| 275061 ||  || — || October 22, 2009 || Catalina || CSS || — || align=right | 2.4 km || 
|-id=062 bgcolor=#fefefe
| 275062 ||  || — || October 23, 2009 || Mount Lemmon || Mount Lemmon Survey || — || align=right data-sort-value="0.83" | 830 m || 
|-id=063 bgcolor=#E9E9E9
| 275063 ||  || — || October 23, 2009 || Mount Lemmon || Mount Lemmon Survey || XIZ || align=right | 1.6 km || 
|-id=064 bgcolor=#E9E9E9
| 275064 ||  || — || October 25, 2009 || Catalina || CSS || — || align=right | 3.6 km || 
|-id=065 bgcolor=#E9E9E9
| 275065 ||  || — || October 29, 2009 || Bisei SG Center || BATTeRS || — || align=right | 1.0 km || 
|-id=066 bgcolor=#E9E9E9
| 275066 ||  || — || October 27, 2009 || La Sagra || OAM Obs. || GER || align=right | 2.1 km || 
|-id=067 bgcolor=#d6d6d6
| 275067 ||  || — || October 29, 2009 || Catalina || CSS || — || align=right | 3.8 km || 
|-id=068 bgcolor=#E9E9E9
| 275068 ||  || — || October 23, 2009 || Kitt Peak || Spacewatch || AGN || align=right | 1.4 km || 
|-id=069 bgcolor=#E9E9E9
| 275069 ||  || — || October 23, 2009 || Mount Lemmon || Mount Lemmon Survey || HOF || align=right | 2.5 km || 
|-id=070 bgcolor=#d6d6d6
| 275070 ||  || — || October 24, 2009 || Catalina || CSS || — || align=right | 4.3 km || 
|-id=071 bgcolor=#E9E9E9
| 275071 ||  || — || October 24, 2009 || Catalina || CSS || — || align=right | 2.2 km || 
|-id=072 bgcolor=#d6d6d6
| 275072 ||  || — || October 26, 2009 || Kitt Peak || Spacewatch || — || align=right | 3.6 km || 
|-id=073 bgcolor=#E9E9E9
| 275073 ||  || — || October 29, 2009 || Catalina || CSS || — || align=right | 1.9 km || 
|-id=074 bgcolor=#fefefe
| 275074 ||  || — || October 21, 2009 || Mount Lemmon || Mount Lemmon Survey || — || align=right | 1.1 km || 
|-id=075 bgcolor=#d6d6d6
| 275075 ||  || — || October 27, 2009 || Mount Lemmon || Mount Lemmon Survey || — || align=right | 4.5 km || 
|-id=076 bgcolor=#fefefe
| 275076 ||  || — || October 24, 2009 || Kitt Peak || Spacewatch || V || align=right data-sort-value="0.90" | 900 m || 
|-id=077 bgcolor=#E9E9E9
| 275077 ||  || — || October 17, 2009 || La Sagra || OAM Obs. || — || align=right | 1.4 km || 
|-id=078 bgcolor=#d6d6d6
| 275078 ||  || — || October 23, 2009 || Catalina || CSS || ALA || align=right | 6.0 km || 
|-id=079 bgcolor=#E9E9E9
| 275079 ||  || — || October 18, 2009 || Mount Lemmon || Mount Lemmon Survey || — || align=right data-sort-value="0.94" | 940 m || 
|-id=080 bgcolor=#d6d6d6
| 275080 ||  || — || March 29, 2004 || Kitt Peak || Spacewatch || 3:2 || align=right | 4.5 km || 
|-id=081 bgcolor=#fefefe
| 275081 ||  || — || October 26, 2009 || Kitt Peak || Spacewatch || V || align=right data-sort-value="0.94" | 940 m || 
|-id=082 bgcolor=#d6d6d6
| 275082 ||  || — || October 16, 2009 || Socorro || LINEAR || — || align=right | 3.9 km || 
|-id=083 bgcolor=#fefefe
| 275083 ||  || — || October 19, 2009 || Socorro || LINEAR || — || align=right | 2.3 km || 
|-id=084 bgcolor=#fefefe
| 275084 ||  || — || October 26, 2009 || Mount Lemmon || Mount Lemmon Survey || V || align=right data-sort-value="0.68" | 680 m || 
|-id=085 bgcolor=#fefefe
| 275085 ||  || — || October 18, 2009 || Mount Lemmon || Mount Lemmon Survey || NYS || align=right data-sort-value="0.67" | 670 m || 
|-id=086 bgcolor=#d6d6d6
| 275086 ||  || — || October 18, 2009 || Mount Lemmon || Mount Lemmon Survey || — || align=right | 3.4 km || 
|-id=087 bgcolor=#E9E9E9
| 275087 ||  || — || November 8, 2009 || Catalina || CSS || MAR || align=right | 1.6 km || 
|-id=088 bgcolor=#fefefe
| 275088 ||  || — || November 8, 2009 || Catalina || CSS || — || align=right data-sort-value="0.87" | 870 m || 
|-id=089 bgcolor=#d6d6d6
| 275089 ||  || — || November 8, 2009 || Mount Lemmon || Mount Lemmon Survey || — || align=right | 2.9 km || 
|-id=090 bgcolor=#fefefe
| 275090 ||  || — || November 8, 2009 || Mount Lemmon || Mount Lemmon Survey || FLO || align=right data-sort-value="0.66" | 660 m || 
|-id=091 bgcolor=#fefefe
| 275091 ||  || — || November 8, 2009 || Mount Lemmon || Mount Lemmon Survey || — || align=right data-sort-value="0.78" | 780 m || 
|-id=092 bgcolor=#fefefe
| 275092 ||  || — || September 1, 2005 || Kitt Peak || Spacewatch || FLO || align=right data-sort-value="0.98" | 980 m || 
|-id=093 bgcolor=#E9E9E9
| 275093 ||  || — || November 9, 2009 || Mount Lemmon || Mount Lemmon Survey || — || align=right | 3.4 km || 
|-id=094 bgcolor=#E9E9E9
| 275094 ||  || — || November 9, 2009 || Mount Lemmon || Mount Lemmon Survey || — || align=right | 1.6 km || 
|-id=095 bgcolor=#E9E9E9
| 275095 ||  || — || November 9, 2009 || Mount Lemmon || Mount Lemmon Survey || — || align=right | 1.4 km || 
|-id=096 bgcolor=#E9E9E9
| 275096 ||  || — || November 8, 2009 || Kitt Peak || Spacewatch || NEM || align=right | 2.2 km || 
|-id=097 bgcolor=#fefefe
| 275097 ||  || — || November 8, 2009 || Catalina || CSS || — || align=right | 1.1 km || 
|-id=098 bgcolor=#fefefe
| 275098 ||  || — || November 9, 2009 || Kitt Peak || Spacewatch || — || align=right data-sort-value="0.92" | 920 m || 
|-id=099 bgcolor=#E9E9E9
| 275099 ||  || — || November 9, 2009 || Kitt Peak || Spacewatch || — || align=right | 1.4 km || 
|-id=100 bgcolor=#E9E9E9
| 275100 ||  || — || November 9, 2009 || Mount Lemmon || Mount Lemmon Survey || ADE || align=right | 2.5 km || 
|}

275101–275200 

|-bgcolor=#E9E9E9
| 275101 ||  || — || November 9, 2009 || Mount Lemmon || Mount Lemmon Survey || — || align=right | 2.1 km || 
|-id=102 bgcolor=#fefefe
| 275102 ||  || — || November 9, 2009 || Catalina || CSS || — || align=right | 1.0 km || 
|-id=103 bgcolor=#E9E9E9
| 275103 ||  || — || November 9, 2009 || Catalina || CSS || — || align=right | 2.8 km || 
|-id=104 bgcolor=#d6d6d6
| 275104 ||  || — || November 11, 2009 || Mayhill || iTelescope Obs. || — || align=right | 4.8 km || 
|-id=105 bgcolor=#d6d6d6
| 275105 ||  || — || November 14, 2009 || Nazaret || G. Muler || — || align=right | 4.1 km || 
|-id=106 bgcolor=#d6d6d6
| 275106 Sarahdubeyjames ||  ||  || November 14, 2009 || Mayhill || N. Falla || — || align=right | 3.3 km || 
|-id=107 bgcolor=#E9E9E9
| 275107 ||  || — || November 9, 2009 || Kitt Peak || Spacewatch || — || align=right | 1.7 km || 
|-id=108 bgcolor=#E9E9E9
| 275108 ||  || — || November 9, 2009 || Catalina || CSS || — || align=right | 1.9 km || 
|-id=109 bgcolor=#fefefe
| 275109 ||  || — || November 14, 2009 || Mayhill || A. Lowe || — || align=right data-sort-value="0.89" | 890 m || 
|-id=110 bgcolor=#fefefe
| 275110 ||  || — || November 11, 2009 || Socorro || LINEAR || — || align=right | 1.3 km || 
|-id=111 bgcolor=#fefefe
| 275111 ||  || — || November 15, 2009 || Kachina || J. Hobart || — || align=right data-sort-value="0.87" | 870 m || 
|-id=112 bgcolor=#E9E9E9
| 275112 ||  || — || November 9, 2009 || Mount Lemmon || Mount Lemmon Survey || — || align=right | 1.2 km || 
|-id=113 bgcolor=#fefefe
| 275113 ||  || — || November 11, 2009 || Kitt Peak || Spacewatch || FLO || align=right data-sort-value="0.81" | 810 m || 
|-id=114 bgcolor=#fefefe
| 275114 ||  || — || November 11, 2009 || Kitt Peak || Spacewatch || V || align=right data-sort-value="0.72" | 720 m || 
|-id=115 bgcolor=#d6d6d6
| 275115 ||  || — || November 11, 2009 || Kitt Peak || Spacewatch || KOR || align=right | 1.4 km || 
|-id=116 bgcolor=#C2FFFF
| 275116 ||  || — || November 11, 2009 || La Sagra || OAM Obs. || L4ERY || align=right | 14 km || 
|-id=117 bgcolor=#E9E9E9
| 275117 ||  || — || November 11, 2009 || La Sagra || OAM Obs. || — || align=right | 1.9 km || 
|-id=118 bgcolor=#d6d6d6
| 275118 ||  || — || November 12, 2009 || La Sagra || OAM Obs. || — || align=right | 4.3 km || 
|-id=119 bgcolor=#fefefe
| 275119 ||  || — || November 15, 2009 || Catalina || CSS || NYS || align=right data-sort-value="0.91" | 910 m || 
|-id=120 bgcolor=#d6d6d6
| 275120 ||  || — || November 8, 2009 || Catalina || CSS || EOS || align=right | 3.5 km || 
|-id=121 bgcolor=#E9E9E9
| 275121 ||  || — || November 9, 2009 || Catalina || CSS || — || align=right | 4.3 km || 
|-id=122 bgcolor=#E9E9E9
| 275122 ||  || — || November 11, 2009 || Catalina || CSS || GER || align=right | 3.7 km || 
|-id=123 bgcolor=#E9E9E9
| 275123 ||  || — || November 8, 2009 || Kitt Peak || Spacewatch || — || align=right | 1.6 km || 
|-id=124 bgcolor=#fefefe
| 275124 ||  || — || November 8, 2009 || Kitt Peak || Spacewatch || — || align=right data-sort-value="0.94" | 940 m || 
|-id=125 bgcolor=#d6d6d6
| 275125 ||  || — || November 9, 2009 || Catalina || CSS || — || align=right | 2.3 km || 
|-id=126 bgcolor=#E9E9E9
| 275126 ||  || — || November 9, 2009 || Kitt Peak || Spacewatch || — || align=right | 1.6 km || 
|-id=127 bgcolor=#d6d6d6
| 275127 ||  || — || November 9, 2009 || Kitt Peak || Spacewatch || — || align=right | 2.6 km || 
|-id=128 bgcolor=#d6d6d6
| 275128 ||  || — || November 9, 2009 || Kitt Peak || Spacewatch || — || align=right | 3.4 km || 
|-id=129 bgcolor=#d6d6d6
| 275129 ||  || — || November 9, 2009 || Kitt Peak || Spacewatch || — || align=right | 2.2 km || 
|-id=130 bgcolor=#d6d6d6
| 275130 ||  || — || November 9, 2009 || Kitt Peak || Spacewatch || — || align=right | 2.9 km || 
|-id=131 bgcolor=#E9E9E9
| 275131 ||  || — || November 9, 2009 || Kitt Peak || Spacewatch || — || align=right | 1.7 km || 
|-id=132 bgcolor=#E9E9E9
| 275132 ||  || — || November 9, 2009 || Kitt Peak || Spacewatch || — || align=right | 2.6 km || 
|-id=133 bgcolor=#E9E9E9
| 275133 ||  || — || November 9, 2009 || Kitt Peak || Spacewatch || GEF || align=right | 1.9 km || 
|-id=134 bgcolor=#d6d6d6
| 275134 ||  || — || November 9, 2009 || Mount Lemmon || Mount Lemmon Survey || — || align=right | 2.7 km || 
|-id=135 bgcolor=#d6d6d6
| 275135 ||  || — || November 9, 2009 || Mount Lemmon || Mount Lemmon Survey || — || align=right | 4.8 km || 
|-id=136 bgcolor=#E9E9E9
| 275136 ||  || — || November 11, 2009 || Kitt Peak || Spacewatch || — || align=right | 1.7 km || 
|-id=137 bgcolor=#C2FFFF
| 275137 ||  || — || November 15, 2009 || Socorro || LINEAR || L4 || align=right | 12 km || 
|-id=138 bgcolor=#E9E9E9
| 275138 ||  || — || September 30, 2005 || Mount Lemmon || Mount Lemmon Survey || — || align=right | 1.0 km || 
|-id=139 bgcolor=#d6d6d6
| 275139 ||  || — || November 12, 2009 || La Sagra || OAM Obs. || — || align=right | 2.7 km || 
|-id=140 bgcolor=#d6d6d6
| 275140 ||  || — || November 13, 2009 || La Sagra || OAM Obs. || — || align=right | 2.4 km || 
|-id=141 bgcolor=#E9E9E9
| 275141 ||  || — || November 15, 2009 || Catalina || CSS || — || align=right | 2.5 km || 
|-id=142 bgcolor=#d6d6d6
| 275142 ||  || — || November 8, 2009 || Catalina || CSS || — || align=right | 3.4 km || 
|-id=143 bgcolor=#d6d6d6
| 275143 ||  || — || November 9, 2009 || Catalina || CSS || — || align=right | 3.2 km || 
|-id=144 bgcolor=#E9E9E9
| 275144 ||  || — || November 9, 2009 || Catalina || CSS || EUN || align=right | 1.5 km || 
|-id=145 bgcolor=#E9E9E9
| 275145 ||  || — || November 11, 2009 || Catalina || CSS || JUN || align=right | 1.3 km || 
|-id=146 bgcolor=#E9E9E9
| 275146 ||  || — || November 15, 2009 || Catalina || CSS || GEF || align=right | 3.4 km || 
|-id=147 bgcolor=#fefefe
| 275147 ||  || — || November 9, 2009 || Kitt Peak || Spacewatch || V || align=right data-sort-value="0.74" | 740 m || 
|-id=148 bgcolor=#d6d6d6
| 275148 ||  || — || November 10, 2009 || Kitt Peak || Spacewatch || — || align=right | 3.9 km || 
|-id=149 bgcolor=#d6d6d6
| 275149 ||  || — || November 10, 2009 || Kitt Peak || Spacewatch || HYG || align=right | 3.9 km || 
|-id=150 bgcolor=#d6d6d6
| 275150 ||  || — || November 11, 2009 || Kitt Peak || Spacewatch || — || align=right | 2.3 km || 
|-id=151 bgcolor=#d6d6d6
| 275151 ||  || — || November 9, 2009 || Catalina || CSS || — || align=right | 3.7 km || 
|-id=152 bgcolor=#fefefe
| 275152 ||  || — || November 9, 2009 || Kitt Peak || Spacewatch || — || align=right | 1.1 km || 
|-id=153 bgcolor=#E9E9E9
| 275153 ||  || — || November 9, 2009 || Mount Lemmon || Mount Lemmon Survey || MIS || align=right | 3.0 km || 
|-id=154 bgcolor=#E9E9E9
| 275154 ||  || — || November 8, 2009 || Kitt Peak || Spacewatch || — || align=right | 2.8 km || 
|-id=155 bgcolor=#d6d6d6
| 275155 ||  || — || November 9, 2009 || Catalina || CSS || — || align=right | 2.4 km || 
|-id=156 bgcolor=#d6d6d6
| 275156 ||  || — || November 9, 2009 || Catalina || CSS || — || align=right | 5.2 km || 
|-id=157 bgcolor=#d6d6d6
| 275157 ||  || — || November 10, 2009 || Kitt Peak || Spacewatch || — || align=right | 3.1 km || 
|-id=158 bgcolor=#fefefe
| 275158 ||  || — || November 10, 2009 || La Sagra || OAM Obs. || — || align=right data-sort-value="0.95" | 950 m || 
|-id=159 bgcolor=#fefefe
| 275159 ||  || — || November 12, 2009 || La Sagra || OAM Obs. || — || align=right data-sort-value="0.93" | 930 m || 
|-id=160 bgcolor=#d6d6d6
| 275160 ||  || — || November 15, 2009 || Socorro || LINEAR || — || align=right | 2.0 km || 
|-id=161 bgcolor=#E9E9E9
| 275161 ||  || — || November 16, 2009 || Mount Lemmon || Mount Lemmon Survey || — || align=right | 1.6 km || 
|-id=162 bgcolor=#d6d6d6
| 275162 ||  || — || November 17, 2009 || Socorro || LINEAR || — || align=right | 2.1 km || 
|-id=163 bgcolor=#E9E9E9
| 275163 ||  || — || November 18, 2009 || Socorro || LINEAR || — || align=right | 1.7 km || 
|-id=164 bgcolor=#E9E9E9
| 275164 ||  || — || November 18, 2009 || Socorro || LINEAR || — || align=right | 1.4 km || 
|-id=165 bgcolor=#d6d6d6
| 275165 ||  || — || November 19, 2009 || Socorro || LINEAR || — || align=right | 7.1 km || 
|-id=166 bgcolor=#E9E9E9
| 275166 ||  || — || November 19, 2009 || Socorro || LINEAR || — || align=right | 1.3 km || 
|-id=167 bgcolor=#d6d6d6
| 275167 ||  || — || November 16, 2009 || Mount Lemmon || Mount Lemmon Survey || HYG || align=right | 4.7 km || 
|-id=168 bgcolor=#E9E9E9
| 275168 ||  || — || November 18, 2009 || Socorro || LINEAR || — || align=right | 1.4 km || 
|-id=169 bgcolor=#fefefe
| 275169 ||  || — || November 16, 2009 || Mount Lemmon || Mount Lemmon Survey || — || align=right | 1.0 km || 
|-id=170 bgcolor=#d6d6d6
| 275170 ||  || — || November 16, 2009 || Kitt Peak || Spacewatch || THM || align=right | 2.5 km || 
|-id=171 bgcolor=#E9E9E9
| 275171 ||  || — || November 16, 2009 || Kitt Peak || Spacewatch || — || align=right | 1.3 km || 
|-id=172 bgcolor=#d6d6d6
| 275172 ||  || — || November 16, 2009 || Kitt Peak || Spacewatch || HYG || align=right | 3.1 km || 
|-id=173 bgcolor=#E9E9E9
| 275173 ||  || — || November 16, 2009 || Kitt Peak || Spacewatch || — || align=right | 1.3 km || 
|-id=174 bgcolor=#d6d6d6
| 275174 ||  || — || November 16, 2009 || Kitt Peak || Spacewatch || — || align=right | 3.7 km || 
|-id=175 bgcolor=#d6d6d6
| 275175 ||  || — || November 16, 2009 || Mount Lemmon || Mount Lemmon Survey || VER || align=right | 4.3 km || 
|-id=176 bgcolor=#fefefe
| 275176 ||  || — || November 17, 2009 || Kitt Peak || Spacewatch || MAS || align=right data-sort-value="0.86" | 860 m || 
|-id=177 bgcolor=#E9E9E9
| 275177 ||  || — || November 17, 2009 || Kitt Peak || Spacewatch || — || align=right | 2.9 km || 
|-id=178 bgcolor=#d6d6d6
| 275178 ||  || — || November 17, 2009 || Kitt Peak || Spacewatch || KOR || align=right | 1.3 km || 
|-id=179 bgcolor=#E9E9E9
| 275179 ||  || — || November 17, 2009 || Kitt Peak || Spacewatch || — || align=right | 1.1 km || 
|-id=180 bgcolor=#E9E9E9
| 275180 ||  || — || November 17, 2009 || Kitt Peak || Spacewatch || PAD || align=right | 3.0 km || 
|-id=181 bgcolor=#E9E9E9
| 275181 ||  || — || November 17, 2009 || Catalina || CSS || — || align=right | 2.9 km || 
|-id=182 bgcolor=#fefefe
| 275182 ||  || — || November 16, 2009 || Mount Lemmon || Mount Lemmon Survey || — || align=right data-sort-value="0.79" | 790 m || 
|-id=183 bgcolor=#E9E9E9
| 275183 ||  || — || November 16, 2009 || Mount Lemmon || Mount Lemmon Survey || HOF || align=right | 3.7 km || 
|-id=184 bgcolor=#E9E9E9
| 275184 ||  || — || November 17, 2009 || Kitt Peak || Spacewatch || — || align=right | 2.7 km || 
|-id=185 bgcolor=#fefefe
| 275185 ||  || — || November 18, 2009 || Kitt Peak || Spacewatch || — || align=right | 1.1 km || 
|-id=186 bgcolor=#d6d6d6
| 275186 ||  || — || November 18, 2009 || Kitt Peak || Spacewatch || — || align=right | 3.9 km || 
|-id=187 bgcolor=#E9E9E9
| 275187 ||  || — || November 18, 2009 || Kitt Peak || Spacewatch || — || align=right | 2.7 km || 
|-id=188 bgcolor=#d6d6d6
| 275188 ||  || — || November 18, 2009 || Kitt Peak || Spacewatch || — || align=right | 2.8 km || 
|-id=189 bgcolor=#E9E9E9
| 275189 ||  || — || November 18, 2009 || Kitt Peak || Spacewatch || AGN || align=right | 1.4 km || 
|-id=190 bgcolor=#fefefe
| 275190 ||  || — || November 19, 2009 || Kitt Peak || Spacewatch || V || align=right data-sort-value="0.71" | 710 m || 
|-id=191 bgcolor=#d6d6d6
| 275191 ||  || — || November 19, 2009 || Kitt Peak || Spacewatch || — || align=right | 5.0 km || 
|-id=192 bgcolor=#E9E9E9
| 275192 ||  || — || November 20, 2009 || Mount Lemmon || Mount Lemmon Survey || — || align=right | 3.0 km || 
|-id=193 bgcolor=#E9E9E9
| 275193 ||  || — || November 22, 2009 || Catalina || CSS || — || align=right | 2.8 km || 
|-id=194 bgcolor=#d6d6d6
| 275194 ||  || — || November 20, 2009 || Kitt Peak || Spacewatch || KOR || align=right | 1.5 km || 
|-id=195 bgcolor=#d6d6d6
| 275195 ||  || — || November 20, 2009 || Kitt Peak || Spacewatch || — || align=right | 5.1 km || 
|-id=196 bgcolor=#E9E9E9
| 275196 ||  || — || April 29, 2003 || Kitt Peak || Spacewatch || — || align=right | 1.2 km || 
|-id=197 bgcolor=#fefefe
| 275197 ||  || — || November 22, 2009 || Catalina || CSS || — || align=right | 1.0 km || 
|-id=198 bgcolor=#d6d6d6
| 275198 ||  || — || November 22, 2009 || Mount Lemmon || Mount Lemmon Survey || — || align=right | 3.3 km || 
|-id=199 bgcolor=#E9E9E9
| 275199 ||  || — || November 18, 2009 || Mount Lemmon || Mount Lemmon Survey || — || align=right | 1.1 km || 
|-id=200 bgcolor=#d6d6d6
| 275200 ||  || — || November 19, 2009 || Mount Lemmon || Mount Lemmon Survey || — || align=right | 4.7 km || 
|}

275201–275300 

|-bgcolor=#d6d6d6
| 275201 ||  || — || November 21, 2009 || Kitt Peak || Spacewatch || — || align=right | 4.6 km || 
|-id=202 bgcolor=#d6d6d6
| 275202 ||  || — || November 21, 2009 || Kitt Peak || Spacewatch || — || align=right | 2.5 km || 
|-id=203 bgcolor=#d6d6d6
| 275203 ||  || — || November 21, 2009 || Kitt Peak || Spacewatch || — || align=right | 3.0 km || 
|-id=204 bgcolor=#fefefe
| 275204 ||  || — || October 1, 2005 || Kitt Peak || Spacewatch || FLO || align=right data-sort-value="0.94" | 940 m || 
|-id=205 bgcolor=#E9E9E9
| 275205 ||  || — || November 21, 2009 || Mount Lemmon || Mount Lemmon Survey || — || align=right | 3.5 km || 
|-id=206 bgcolor=#E9E9E9
| 275206 ||  || — || November 22, 2009 || Kitt Peak || Spacewatch || — || align=right | 3.0 km || 
|-id=207 bgcolor=#d6d6d6
| 275207 ||  || — || November 22, 2009 || Kitt Peak || Spacewatch || — || align=right | 5.3 km || 
|-id=208 bgcolor=#E9E9E9
| 275208 ||  || — || November 23, 2009 || Catalina || CSS || GEF || align=right | 1.3 km || 
|-id=209 bgcolor=#d6d6d6
| 275209 ||  || — || November 23, 2009 || Mount Lemmon || Mount Lemmon Survey || HYG || align=right | 2.7 km || 
|-id=210 bgcolor=#E9E9E9
| 275210 ||  || — || November 23, 2009 || Mount Lemmon || Mount Lemmon Survey || HOF || align=right | 3.3 km || 
|-id=211 bgcolor=#E9E9E9
| 275211 ||  || — || November 23, 2009 || Kitt Peak || Spacewatch || — || align=right | 1.3 km || 
|-id=212 bgcolor=#fefefe
| 275212 ||  || — || April 16, 2001 || Anderson Mesa || LONEOS || — || align=right | 1.0 km || 
|-id=213 bgcolor=#E9E9E9
| 275213 ||  || — || November 23, 2009 || Kitt Peak || Spacewatch || HEN || align=right | 1.1 km || 
|-id=214 bgcolor=#E9E9E9
| 275214 ||  || — || November 23, 2009 || Purple Mountain || PMO NEO || MIS || align=right | 2.0 km || 
|-id=215 bgcolor=#E9E9E9
| 275215 Didiermarouani ||  ||  || November 23, 2009 || Zelenchukskaya || T. V. Kryachko || MAR || align=right | 1.5 km || 
|-id=216 bgcolor=#E9E9E9
| 275216 ||  || — || November 24, 2009 || La Sagra || OAM Obs. || — || align=right | 1.8 km || 
|-id=217 bgcolor=#fefefe
| 275217 ||  || — || November 24, 2009 || Mount Lemmon || Mount Lemmon Survey || — || align=right data-sort-value="0.77" | 770 m || 
|-id=218 bgcolor=#fefefe
| 275218 ||  || — || November 24, 2009 || Purple Mountain || PMO NEO || — || align=right data-sort-value="0.71" | 710 m || 
|-id=219 bgcolor=#E9E9E9
| 275219 ||  || — || November 25, 2009 || La Sagra || OAM Obs. || — || align=right | 1.4 km || 
|-id=220 bgcolor=#E9E9E9
| 275220 ||  || — || November 25, 2009 || Kitt Peak || Spacewatch || — || align=right data-sort-value="0.97" | 970 m || 
|-id=221 bgcolor=#d6d6d6
| 275221 ||  || — || November 25, 2009 || Catalina || CSS || THM || align=right | 2.6 km || 
|-id=222 bgcolor=#d6d6d6
| 275222 ||  || — || February 4, 2005 || Kitt Peak || Spacewatch || — || align=right | 2.9 km || 
|-id=223 bgcolor=#fefefe
| 275223 ||  || — || November 17, 2009 || Kitt Peak || Spacewatch || FLO || align=right data-sort-value="0.75" | 750 m || 
|-id=224 bgcolor=#fefefe
| 275224 ||  || — || April 30, 2000 || Anderson Mesa || LONEOS || — || align=right | 1.1 km || 
|-id=225 bgcolor=#fefefe
| 275225 ||  || — || November 20, 2009 || Andrushivka || Andrushivka Obs. || — || align=right | 1.3 km || 
|-id=226 bgcolor=#E9E9E9
| 275226 ||  || — || November 17, 2009 || Catalina || CSS || — || align=right | 1.3 km || 
|-id=227 bgcolor=#E9E9E9
| 275227 ||  || — || November 18, 2009 || La Silla || La Silla Obs. || PAD || align=right | 2.8 km || 
|-id=228 bgcolor=#E9E9E9
| 275228 ||  || — || November 17, 2009 || La Silla || La Silla Obs. || — || align=right | 3.3 km || 
|-id=229 bgcolor=#E9E9E9
| 275229 ||  || — || November 16, 2009 || Mount Lemmon || Mount Lemmon Survey || — || align=right | 1.5 km || 
|-id=230 bgcolor=#fefefe
| 275230 ||  || — || October 15, 2002 || Palomar || NEAT || — || align=right | 1.1 km || 
|-id=231 bgcolor=#d6d6d6
| 275231 ||  || — || September 16, 2003 || Kitt Peak || Spacewatch || — || align=right | 2.9 km || 
|-id=232 bgcolor=#d6d6d6
| 275232 ||  || — || November 16, 2009 || Kitt Peak || Spacewatch || — || align=right | 3.4 km || 
|-id=233 bgcolor=#E9E9E9
| 275233 ||  || — || November 23, 2009 || Mount Lemmon || Mount Lemmon Survey || — || align=right | 1.3 km || 
|-id=234 bgcolor=#E9E9E9
| 275234 ||  || — || November 25, 2009 || Kitt Peak || Spacewatch || — || align=right | 1.7 km || 
|-id=235 bgcolor=#d6d6d6
| 275235 ||  || — || November 25, 2009 || Kitt Peak || Spacewatch || KOR || align=right | 1.7 km || 
|-id=236 bgcolor=#d6d6d6
| 275236 ||  || — || November 25, 2009 || Kitt Peak || Spacewatch || — || align=right | 4.0 km || 
|-id=237 bgcolor=#fefefe
| 275237 ||  || — || November 21, 2009 || Kitt Peak || Spacewatch || FLO || align=right data-sort-value="0.96" | 960 m || 
|-id=238 bgcolor=#E9E9E9
| 275238 ||  || — || November 20, 2009 || Mount Lemmon || Mount Lemmon Survey || — || align=right | 1.6 km || 
|-id=239 bgcolor=#d6d6d6
| 275239 || 2009 XH || — || December 6, 2009 || Pla D'Arguines || R. Ferrando || THM || align=right | 2.1 km || 
|-id=240 bgcolor=#E9E9E9
| 275240 ||  || — || December 11, 2009 || Mayhill || iTelescope Obs. || EUN || align=right | 1.5 km || 
|-id=241 bgcolor=#E9E9E9
| 275241 ||  || — || December 8, 2009 || La Sagra || OAM Obs. || — || align=right | 1.5 km || 
|-id=242 bgcolor=#E9E9E9
| 275242 ||  || — || December 9, 2009 || La Sagra || OAM Obs. || NEM || align=right | 3.9 km || 
|-id=243 bgcolor=#E9E9E9
| 275243 ||  || — || December 9, 2009 || La Sagra || OAM Obs. || HOF || align=right | 3.5 km || 
|-id=244 bgcolor=#E9E9E9
| 275244 ||  || — || December 10, 2009 || Mount Lemmon || Mount Lemmon Survey || — || align=right | 1.5 km || 
|-id=245 bgcolor=#d6d6d6
| 275245 ||  || — || December 11, 2009 || Dauban || F. Kugel || SHU3:2 || align=right | 5.1 km || 
|-id=246 bgcolor=#d6d6d6
| 275246 ||  || — || December 10, 2009 || Socorro || LINEAR || — || align=right | 4.4 km || 
|-id=247 bgcolor=#E9E9E9
| 275247 ||  || — || December 10, 2009 || Mount Lemmon || Mount Lemmon Survey || — || align=right | 3.4 km || 
|-id=248 bgcolor=#E9E9E9
| 275248 ||  || — || December 10, 2009 || La Sagra || OAM Obs. || ADE || align=right | 3.2 km || 
|-id=249 bgcolor=#d6d6d6
| 275249 ||  || — || December 15, 2009 || Mount Lemmon || Mount Lemmon Survey || — || align=right | 3.2 km || 
|-id=250 bgcolor=#E9E9E9
| 275250 ||  || — || December 15, 2009 || Mount Lemmon || Mount Lemmon Survey || — || align=right | 3.0 km || 
|-id=251 bgcolor=#E9E9E9
| 275251 ||  || — || December 15, 2009 || Mount Lemmon || Mount Lemmon Survey || — || align=right | 3.0 km || 
|-id=252 bgcolor=#E9E9E9
| 275252 ||  || — || December 9, 2009 || La Sagra || OAM Obs. || — || align=right | 3.0 km || 
|-id=253 bgcolor=#E9E9E9
| 275253 ||  || — || December 9, 2009 || La Sagra || OAM Obs. || WIT || align=right | 1.9 km || 
|-id=254 bgcolor=#d6d6d6
| 275254 ||  || — || April 21, 2006 || Kitt Peak || Spacewatch || — || align=right | 4.2 km || 
|-id=255 bgcolor=#fefefe
| 275255 ||  || — || December 15, 2009 || Mount Lemmon || Mount Lemmon Survey || — || align=right | 1.3 km || 
|-id=256 bgcolor=#d6d6d6
| 275256 ||  || — || December 17, 2009 || Mount Lemmon || Mount Lemmon Survey || KOR || align=right | 3.2 km || 
|-id=257 bgcolor=#E9E9E9
| 275257 ||  || — || December 17, 2009 || Mount Lemmon || Mount Lemmon Survey || HOF || align=right | 3.2 km || 
|-id=258 bgcolor=#d6d6d6
| 275258 ||  || — || December 17, 2009 || Mount Lemmon || Mount Lemmon Survey || EOS || align=right | 3.7 km || 
|-id=259 bgcolor=#d6d6d6
| 275259 ||  || — || December 18, 2009 || Mount Lemmon || Mount Lemmon Survey || EOS || align=right | 2.8 km || 
|-id=260 bgcolor=#d6d6d6
| 275260 ||  || — || December 18, 2009 || Mount Lemmon || Mount Lemmon Survey || — || align=right | 4.3 km || 
|-id=261 bgcolor=#d6d6d6
| 275261 ||  || — || December 26, 2009 || Kitt Peak || Spacewatch || VER || align=right | 6.3 km || 
|-id=262 bgcolor=#d6d6d6
| 275262 ||  || — || December 16, 2009 || Socorro || LINEAR || — || align=right | 4.6 km || 
|-id=263 bgcolor=#d6d6d6
| 275263 ||  || — || January 6, 2010 || Socorro || LINEAR || — || align=right | 3.7 km || 
|-id=264 bgcolor=#d6d6d6
| 275264 Krisztike ||  ||  || January 9, 2010 || Mayhill || S. Kürti || VER || align=right | 3.8 km || 
|-id=265 bgcolor=#d6d6d6
| 275265 ||  || — || January 4, 2010 || Kitt Peak || Spacewatch || — || align=right | 4.2 km || 
|-id=266 bgcolor=#d6d6d6
| 275266 ||  || — || January 6, 2010 || Kitt Peak || Spacewatch || EOS || align=right | 3.0 km || 
|-id=267 bgcolor=#d6d6d6
| 275267 ||  || — || January 7, 2010 || Mount Lemmon || Mount Lemmon Survey || 628 || align=right | 2.5 km || 
|-id=268 bgcolor=#d6d6d6
| 275268 ||  || — || January 7, 2010 || Mount Lemmon || Mount Lemmon Survey || THM || align=right | 3.0 km || 
|-id=269 bgcolor=#E9E9E9
| 275269 ||  || — || January 6, 2010 || Mount Lemmon || Mount Lemmon Survey || — || align=right | 2.3 km || 
|-id=270 bgcolor=#d6d6d6
| 275270 ||  || — || January 7, 2010 || Kitt Peak || Spacewatch || — || align=right | 4.3 km || 
|-id=271 bgcolor=#d6d6d6
| 275271 ||  || — || January 12, 2010 || Mayhill || A. Lowe || — || align=right | 4.5 km || 
|-id=272 bgcolor=#d6d6d6
| 275272 ||  || — || January 6, 2010 || Kitt Peak || Spacewatch || — || align=right | 5.8 km || 
|-id=273 bgcolor=#E9E9E9
| 275273 ||  || — || January 7, 2010 || Mount Lemmon || Mount Lemmon Survey || — || align=right | 3.0 km || 
|-id=274 bgcolor=#fefefe
| 275274 ||  || — || January 7, 2010 || Mount Lemmon || Mount Lemmon Survey || V || align=right data-sort-value="0.82" | 820 m || 
|-id=275 bgcolor=#d6d6d6
| 275275 ||  || — || January 11, 2010 || Kitt Peak || Spacewatch || EOS || align=right | 3.0 km || 
|-id=276 bgcolor=#d6d6d6
| 275276 ||  || — || January 11, 2010 || Kitt Peak || Spacewatch || — || align=right | 4.0 km || 
|-id=277 bgcolor=#fefefe
| 275277 ||  || — || January 8, 2010 || WISE || WISE || FLO || align=right | 1.6 km || 
|-id=278 bgcolor=#C2FFFF
| 275278 ||  || — || April 7, 2003 || Kitt Peak || Spacewatch || L4 || align=right | 16 km || 
|-id=279 bgcolor=#C2FFFF
| 275279 ||  || — || December 31, 2000 || Haleakala || NEAT || L4 || align=right | 14 km || 
|-id=280 bgcolor=#d6d6d6
| 275280 ||  || — || December 15, 1999 || Kitt Peak || Spacewatch || — || align=right | 5.4 km || 
|-id=281 bgcolor=#E9E9E9
| 275281 Amywalsh ||  ||  || January 14, 2010 || WISE || WISE || MIT || align=right | 1.9 km || 
|-id=282 bgcolor=#d6d6d6
| 275282 ||  || — || January 17, 2010 || Dauban || F. Kugel || — || align=right | 3.7 km || 
|-id=283 bgcolor=#d6d6d6
| 275283 ||  || — || May 18, 2001 || Anderson Mesa || LONEOS || — || align=right | 5.1 km || 
|-id=284 bgcolor=#d6d6d6
| 275284 ||  || — || October 18, 2003 || Kitt Peak || Spacewatch || — || align=right | 3.9 km || 
|-id=285 bgcolor=#d6d6d6
| 275285 ||  || — || March 26, 2006 || Kitt Peak || Spacewatch || HYG || align=right | 4.0 km || 
|-id=286 bgcolor=#d6d6d6
| 275286 ||  || — || February 13, 2010 || Mount Lemmon || Mount Lemmon Survey || — || align=right | 5.0 km || 
|-id=287 bgcolor=#d6d6d6
| 275287 ||  || — || February 9, 2010 || Kitt Peak || Spacewatch || — || align=right | 3.5 km || 
|-id=288 bgcolor=#d6d6d6
| 275288 ||  || — || February 9, 2010 || Mount Lemmon || Mount Lemmon Survey || 3:2 || align=right | 7.3 km || 
|-id=289 bgcolor=#d6d6d6
| 275289 ||  || — || February 5, 2010 || Catalina || CSS || — || align=right | 4.5 km || 
|-id=290 bgcolor=#d6d6d6
| 275290 ||  || — || March 3, 2010 || WISE || WISE || — || align=right | 4.1 km || 
|-id=291 bgcolor=#E9E9E9
| 275291 ||  || — || October 16, 2003 || Kitt Peak || Spacewatch || — || align=right | 1.8 km || 
|-id=292 bgcolor=#fefefe
| 275292 ||  || — || July 29, 2000 || Anderson Mesa || LONEOS || FLO || align=right | 1.1 km || 
|-id=293 bgcolor=#fefefe
| 275293 ||  || — || May 5, 2006 || Kitt Peak || Spacewatch || — || align=right | 2.6 km || 
|-id=294 bgcolor=#fefefe
| 275294 ||  || — || October 7, 2000 || Kitt Peak || Spacewatch || — || align=right | 1.2 km || 
|-id=295 bgcolor=#E9E9E9
| 275295 ||  || — || July 12, 2010 || WISE || WISE || — || align=right | 2.3 km || 
|-id=296 bgcolor=#E9E9E9
| 275296 ||  || — || July 16, 2010 || WISE || WISE || — || align=right | 2.6 km || 
|-id=297 bgcolor=#E9E9E9
| 275297 ||  || — || February 9, 2008 || Kitt Peak || Spacewatch || — || align=right | 3.1 km || 
|-id=298 bgcolor=#E9E9E9
| 275298 ||  || — || October 21, 2001 || Kitt Peak || Spacewatch || — || align=right | 3.0 km || 
|-id=299 bgcolor=#d6d6d6
| 275299 ||  || — || October 31, 2005 || Mauna Kea || A. Boattini || 3:2 || align=right | 6.3 km || 
|-id=300 bgcolor=#d6d6d6
| 275300 ||  || — || March 26, 2003 || Kitt Peak || Spacewatch || slow || align=right | 5.1 km || 
|}

275301–275400 

|-bgcolor=#d6d6d6
| 275301 ||  || — || April 4, 2002 || Palomar || NEAT || — || align=right | 5.2 km || 
|-id=302 bgcolor=#d6d6d6
| 275302 ||  || — || January 13, 2002 || Socorro || LINEAR || — || align=right | 3.5 km || 
|-id=303 bgcolor=#d6d6d6
| 275303 ||  || — || December 22, 2005 || Catalina || CSS || — || align=right | 5.2 km || 
|-id=304 bgcolor=#d6d6d6
| 275304 ||  || — || November 25, 2005 || Catalina || CSS || EUP || align=right | 5.7 km || 
|-id=305 bgcolor=#fefefe
| 275305 ||  || — || June 22, 2006 || Kitt Peak || Spacewatch || NYS || align=right data-sort-value="0.69" | 690 m || 
|-id=306 bgcolor=#E9E9E9
| 275306 ||  || — || June 15, 2010 || Mount Lemmon || Mount Lemmon Survey || — || align=right | 1.9 km || 
|-id=307 bgcolor=#E9E9E9
| 275307 ||  || — || November 7, 2002 || Socorro || LINEAR || — || align=right | 1.0 km || 
|-id=308 bgcolor=#fefefe
| 275308 ||  || — || December 16, 2007 || Mount Lemmon || Mount Lemmon Survey || — || align=right data-sort-value="0.75" | 750 m || 
|-id=309 bgcolor=#fefefe
| 275309 ||  || — || October 1, 1999 || Catalina || CSS || MAS || align=right data-sort-value="0.92" | 920 m || 
|-id=310 bgcolor=#FA8072
| 275310 ||  || — || February 7, 2006 || Kitt Peak || Spacewatch || — || align=right data-sort-value="0.94" | 940 m || 
|-id=311 bgcolor=#E9E9E9
| 275311 ||  || — || August 22, 2001 || Socorro || LINEAR || — || align=right | 1.7 km || 
|-id=312 bgcolor=#d6d6d6
| 275312 ||  || — || January 25, 2001 || Lime Creek || R. Linderholm || — || align=right | 4.3 km || 
|-id=313 bgcolor=#d6d6d6
| 275313 ||  || — || October 31, 1999 || Kitt Peak || Spacewatch || — || align=right | 3.5 km || 
|-id=314 bgcolor=#fefefe
| 275314 ||  || — || March 16, 2009 || Kitt Peak || Spacewatch || — || align=right | 1.9 km || 
|-id=315 bgcolor=#E9E9E9
| 275315 ||  || — || September 20, 2001 || Apache Point || SDSS || — || align=right | 2.3 km || 
|-id=316 bgcolor=#E9E9E9
| 275316 ||  || — || February 24, 2009 || Mount Lemmon || Mount Lemmon Survey || — || align=right | 2.0 km || 
|-id=317 bgcolor=#fefefe
| 275317 ||  || — || October 16, 2003 || Kitt Peak || Spacewatch || — || align=right data-sort-value="0.91" | 910 m || 
|-id=318 bgcolor=#d6d6d6
| 275318 ||  || — || April 13, 2002 || Palomar || NEAT || — || align=right | 4.9 km || 
|-id=319 bgcolor=#C2FFFF
| 275319 ||  || — || April 21, 2004 || Kitt Peak || Spacewatch || L4 || align=right | 11 km || 
|-id=320 bgcolor=#d6d6d6
| 275320 ||  || — || October 27, 2003 || Kitt Peak || Spacewatch || 7:4 || align=right | 6.2 km || 
|-id=321 bgcolor=#fefefe
| 275321 ||  || — || July 18, 2006 || Siding Spring || SSS || FLO || align=right data-sort-value="0.69" | 690 m || 
|-id=322 bgcolor=#C2FFFF
| 275322 ||  || — || October 16, 1998 || Kitt Peak || Spacewatch || L4 || align=right | 9.5 km || 
|-id=323 bgcolor=#d6d6d6
| 275323 ||  || — || November 25, 2005 || Catalina || CSS || — || align=right | 3.4 km || 
|-id=324 bgcolor=#C2FFFF
| 275324 ||  || — || December 27, 2000 || Anderson Mesa || LONEOS || L4 || align=right | 12 km || 
|-id=325 bgcolor=#E9E9E9
| 275325 ||  || — || April 13, 2008 || Kitt Peak || Spacewatch || ADE || align=right | 2.1 km || 
|-id=326 bgcolor=#d6d6d6
| 275326 ||  || — || September 13, 2004 || Kitt Peak || Spacewatch || — || align=right | 2.6 km || 
|-id=327 bgcolor=#E9E9E9
| 275327 ||  || — || January 8, 2007 || Kitt Peak || Spacewatch || — || align=right | 2.3 km || 
|-id=328 bgcolor=#fefefe
| 275328 ||  || — || February 16, 2004 || Kitt Peak || Spacewatch || NYS || align=right data-sort-value="0.73" | 730 m || 
|-id=329 bgcolor=#fefefe
| 275329 ||  || — || December 19, 2003 || Kitt Peak || Spacewatch || — || align=right data-sort-value="0.82" | 820 m || 
|-id=330 bgcolor=#d6d6d6
| 275330 ||  || — || December 4, 2005 || Kitt Peak || Spacewatch || — || align=right | 4.7 km || 
|-id=331 bgcolor=#fefefe
| 275331 ||  || — || September 29, 2000 || Kitt Peak || Spacewatch || — || align=right data-sort-value="0.78" | 780 m || 
|-id=332 bgcolor=#C2FFFF
| 275332 ||  || — || November 15, 1998 || Kitt Peak || Spacewatch || L4 || align=right | 10 km || 
|-id=333 bgcolor=#C2FFFF
| 275333 ||  || — || April 4, 2003 || Kitt Peak || Spacewatch || L4ERY || align=right | 9.5 km || 
|-id=334 bgcolor=#E9E9E9
| 275334 ||  || — || February 18, 2008 || Mount Lemmon || Mount Lemmon Survey || — || align=right | 1.7 km || 
|-id=335 bgcolor=#d6d6d6
| 275335 ||  || — || October 25, 2005 || Mount Lemmon || Mount Lemmon Survey || — || align=right | 2.8 km || 
|-id=336 bgcolor=#E9E9E9
| 275336 ||  || — || November 16, 2006 || Kitt Peak || Spacewatch || — || align=right | 1.0 km || 
|-id=337 bgcolor=#fefefe
| 275337 ||  || — || December 16, 2003 || Kitt Peak || Spacewatch || — || align=right | 1.0 km || 
|-id=338 bgcolor=#E9E9E9
| 275338 ||  || — || November 4, 2005 || Mount Lemmon || Mount Lemmon Survey || — || align=right | 3.7 km || 
|-id=339 bgcolor=#d6d6d6
| 275339 ||  || — || November 11, 2004 || Kitt Peak || Spacewatch || — || align=right | 4.7 km || 
|-id=340 bgcolor=#E9E9E9
| 275340 ||  || — || September 13, 2005 || Kitt Peak || Spacewatch || — || align=right | 2.0 km || 
|-id=341 bgcolor=#d6d6d6
| 275341 ||  || — || January 19, 2001 || Socorro || LINEAR || — || align=right | 2.7 km || 
|-id=342 bgcolor=#C2FFFF
| 275342 ||  || — || September 18, 2009 || Catalina || CSS || L4 || align=right | 15 km || 
|-id=343 bgcolor=#d6d6d6
| 275343 ||  || — || January 4, 2001 || Kitt Peak || Spacewatch || — || align=right | 4.2 km || 
|-id=344 bgcolor=#fefefe
| 275344 ||  || — || October 1, 2005 || Kitt Peak || Spacewatch || MAS || align=right | 1.1 km || 
|-id=345 bgcolor=#E9E9E9
| 275345 ||  || — || July 30, 2008 || Mount Lemmon || Mount Lemmon Survey || — || align=right | 2.4 km || 
|-id=346 bgcolor=#E9E9E9
| 275346 ||  || — || December 5, 2002 || Kitt Peak || Spacewatch || — || align=right | 2.0 km || 
|-id=347 bgcolor=#FA8072
| 275347 ||  || — || January 6, 2006 || Catalina || CSS || H || align=right | 1.0 km || 
|-id=348 bgcolor=#E9E9E9
| 275348 ||  || — || July 22, 1995 || Kitt Peak || Spacewatch || — || align=right | 3.0 km || 
|-id=349 bgcolor=#fefefe
| 275349 ||  || — || March 22, 2001 || Kitt Peak || Spacewatch || — || align=right data-sort-value="0.87" | 870 m || 
|-id=350 bgcolor=#fefefe
| 275350 ||  || — || January 9, 2007 || Mount Lemmon || Mount Lemmon Survey || NYS || align=right | 1.0 km || 
|-id=351 bgcolor=#E9E9E9
| 275351 ||  || — || October 27, 2005 || Mount Lemmon || Mount Lemmon Survey || — || align=right | 1.8 km || 
|-id=352 bgcolor=#d6d6d6
| 275352 ||  || — || January 9, 2006 || Mount Lemmon || Mount Lemmon Survey || — || align=right | 3.7 km || 
|-id=353 bgcolor=#d6d6d6
| 275353 ||  || — || February 29, 2000 || Socorro || LINEAR || — || align=right | 4.9 km || 
|-id=354 bgcolor=#E9E9E9
| 275354 ||  || — || August 29, 2005 || Kitt Peak || Spacewatch || — || align=right | 1.6 km || 
|-id=355 bgcolor=#fefefe
| 275355 ||  || — || January 12, 2004 || Nogales || Tenagra II Obs. || — || align=right data-sort-value="0.67" | 670 m || 
|-id=356 bgcolor=#fefefe
| 275356 ||  || — || October 9, 1999 || Kitt Peak || Spacewatch || — || align=right data-sort-value="0.80" | 800 m || 
|-id=357 bgcolor=#E9E9E9
| 275357 ||  || — || March 27, 2003 || Kitt Peak || Spacewatch || MIS || align=right | 2.6 km || 
|-id=358 bgcolor=#E9E9E9
| 275358 ||  || — || February 10, 2002 || Socorro || LINEAR || HOF || align=right | 3.4 km || 
|-id=359 bgcolor=#d6d6d6
| 275359 ||  || — || March 25, 2007 || Mount Lemmon || Mount Lemmon Survey || — || align=right | 4.5 km || 
|-id=360 bgcolor=#E9E9E9
| 275360 ||  || — || October 14, 2001 || Kitt Peak || Spacewatch || — || align=right | 1.3 km || 
|-id=361 bgcolor=#E9E9E9
| 275361 ||  || — || December 24, 2006 || Kitt Peak || Spacewatch || — || align=right data-sort-value="0.92" | 920 m || 
|-id=362 bgcolor=#E9E9E9
| 275362 ||  || — || September 23, 2004 || Kitt Peak || Spacewatch || — || align=right | 3.1 km || 
|-id=363 bgcolor=#E9E9E9
| 275363 ||  || — || October 25, 2001 || Socorro || LINEAR || IAN || align=right | 1.1 km || 
|-id=364 bgcolor=#fefefe
| 275364 ||  || — || January 10, 2007 || Catalina || CSS || — || align=right | 1.1 km || 
|-id=365 bgcolor=#E9E9E9
| 275365 ||  || — || January 5, 2002 || Kitt Peak || Spacewatch || — || align=right | 2.9 km || 
|-id=366 bgcolor=#fefefe
| 275366 ||  || — || February 22, 2004 || Kitt Peak || Spacewatch || FLO || align=right data-sort-value="0.62" | 620 m || 
|-id=367 bgcolor=#E9E9E9
| 275367 ||  || — || February 6, 1997 || Kitt Peak || Spacewatch || HOF || align=right | 3.9 km || 
|-id=368 bgcolor=#d6d6d6
| 275368 ||  || — || October 2, 2003 || Kitt Peak || Spacewatch || — || align=right | 2.7 km || 
|-id=369 bgcolor=#fefefe
| 275369 ||  || — || June 17, 2005 || Mount Lemmon || Mount Lemmon Survey || SUL || align=right | 2.2 km || 
|-id=370 bgcolor=#d6d6d6
| 275370 ||  || — || March 2, 1995 || Kitt Peak || Spacewatch || — || align=right | 3.2 km || 
|-id=371 bgcolor=#C2FFFF
| 275371 ||  || — || September 13, 2007 || Mount Lemmon || Mount Lemmon Survey || L4 || align=right | 5.6 km || 
|-id=372 bgcolor=#d6d6d6
| 275372 ||  || — || November 30, 2003 || Kitt Peak || Spacewatch || — || align=right | 4.3 km || 
|-id=373 bgcolor=#fefefe
| 275373 ||  || — || January 19, 2004 || Kitt Peak || Spacewatch || — || align=right data-sort-value="0.85" | 850 m || 
|-id=374 bgcolor=#fefefe
| 275374 ||  || — || December 13, 2006 || Mount Lemmon || Mount Lemmon Survey || NYS || align=right | 1.0 km || 
|-id=375 bgcolor=#fefefe
| 275375 ||  || — || March 20, 2001 || Kanab || E. E. Sheridan || — || align=right | 1.2 km || 
|-id=376 bgcolor=#fefefe
| 275376 ||  || — || September 19, 1998 || Apache Point || SDSS || — || align=right data-sort-value="0.83" | 830 m || 
|-id=377 bgcolor=#d6d6d6
| 275377 ||  || — || November 10, 2004 || Kitt Peak || Spacewatch || THM || align=right | 2.2 km || 
|-id=378 bgcolor=#E9E9E9
| 275378 ||  || — || August 20, 2004 || Kitt Peak || Spacewatch || AST || align=right | 1.8 km || 
|-id=379 bgcolor=#E9E9E9
| 275379 ||  || — || February 14, 2002 || Kitt Peak || Spacewatch || HOF || align=right | 2.8 km || 
|-id=380 bgcolor=#d6d6d6
| 275380 ||  || — || September 30, 2003 || Kitt Peak || Spacewatch || — || align=right | 3.4 km || 
|-id=381 bgcolor=#fefefe
| 275381 ||  || — || February 1, 2000 || Kitt Peak || Spacewatch || MAS || align=right data-sort-value="0.69" | 690 m || 
|-id=382 bgcolor=#E9E9E9
| 275382 ||  || — || August 29, 2005 || Kitt Peak || Spacewatch || — || align=right | 1.0 km || 
|-id=383 bgcolor=#E9E9E9
| 275383 ||  || — || December 6, 2005 || Kitt Peak || Spacewatch || — || align=right | 2.1 km || 
|-id=384 bgcolor=#d6d6d6
| 275384 ||  || — || September 4, 2008 || Kitt Peak || Spacewatch || — || align=right | 4.0 km || 
|-id=385 bgcolor=#d6d6d6
| 275385 ||  || — || March 26, 2006 || Siding Spring || SSS || — || align=right | 4.3 km || 
|-id=386 bgcolor=#E9E9E9
| 275386 ||  || — || July 21, 2004 || Siding Spring || SSS || — || align=right | 3.1 km || 
|-id=387 bgcolor=#E9E9E9
| 275387 ||  || — || March 25, 2003 || Kitt Peak || Spacewatch || MAR || align=right | 1.0 km || 
|-id=388 bgcolor=#d6d6d6
| 275388 ||  || — || September 4, 2008 || Kitt Peak || Spacewatch || — || align=right | 5.3 km || 
|-id=389 bgcolor=#E9E9E9
| 275389 ||  || — || January 27, 2007 || Mount Lemmon || Mount Lemmon Survey || — || align=right | 1.4 km || 
|-id=390 bgcolor=#E9E9E9
| 275390 ||  || — || September 24, 2005 || Kitt Peak || Spacewatch || — || align=right | 1.5 km || 
|-id=391 bgcolor=#d6d6d6
| 275391 ||  || — || March 4, 2006 || Kitt Peak || Spacewatch || — || align=right | 2.9 km || 
|-id=392 bgcolor=#d6d6d6
| 275392 ||  || — || December 18, 2004 || Kitt Peak || Spacewatch || — || align=right | 3.7 km || 
|-id=393 bgcolor=#d6d6d6
| 275393 ||  || — || September 19, 2003 || Anderson Mesa || LONEOS || — || align=right | 4.4 km || 
|-id=394 bgcolor=#E9E9E9
| 275394 ||  || — || December 4, 2005 || Kitt Peak || Spacewatch || HOF || align=right | 3.7 km || 
|-id=395 bgcolor=#E9E9E9
| 275395 ||  || — || March 9, 2003 || Anderson Mesa || LONEOS || KAZ || align=right | 1.6 km || 
|-id=396 bgcolor=#d6d6d6
| 275396 ||  || — || March 10, 2000 || Kitt Peak || Spacewatch || — || align=right | 5.4 km || 
|-id=397 bgcolor=#fefefe
| 275397 ||  || — || August 26, 1998 || Kitt Peak || Spacewatch || MAS || align=right data-sort-value="0.84" | 840 m || 
|-id=398 bgcolor=#d6d6d6
| 275398 ||  || — || January 28, 2000 || Kitt Peak || Spacewatch || EOS || align=right | 1.8 km || 
|-id=399 bgcolor=#fefefe
| 275399 ||  || — || April 1, 2000 || Kitt Peak || Spacewatch || MAS || align=right | 1.0 km || 
|-id=400 bgcolor=#fefefe
| 275400 ||  || — || May 1, 2000 || Anderson Mesa || LONEOS || — || align=right | 1.0 km || 
|}

275401–275500 

|-bgcolor=#E9E9E9
| 275401 ||  || — || November 26, 2005 || Kitt Peak || Spacewatch || — || align=right | 2.4 km || 
|-id=402 bgcolor=#E9E9E9
| 275402 ||  || — || May 23, 2001 || Cerro Tololo || M. W. Buie || BAR || align=right | 1.3 km || 
|-id=403 bgcolor=#d6d6d6
| 275403 ||  || — || January 9, 2006 || Kitt Peak || Spacewatch || — || align=right | 2.4 km || 
|-id=404 bgcolor=#d6d6d6
| 275404 ||  || — || April 5, 1995 || Kitt Peak || Spacewatch || — || align=right | 3.2 km || 
|-id=405 bgcolor=#fefefe
| 275405 ||  || — || December 19, 2003 || Socorro || LINEAR || — || align=right data-sort-value="0.89" | 890 m || 
|-id=406 bgcolor=#E9E9E9
| 275406 ||  || — || March 5, 2002 || Apache Point || SDSS || WIT || align=right | 1.0 km || 
|-id=407 bgcolor=#d6d6d6
| 275407 ||  || — || January 23, 2006 || Kitt Peak || Spacewatch || 628 || align=right | 2.7 km || 
|-id=408 bgcolor=#d6d6d6
| 275408 ||  || — || September 18, 1995 || Kitt Peak || Spacewatch || 7:4 || align=right | 4.4 km || 
|-id=409 bgcolor=#E9E9E9
| 275409 ||  || — || March 11, 2002 || Palomar || NEAT || NEM || align=right | 3.3 km || 
|-id=410 bgcolor=#d6d6d6
| 275410 ||  || — || April 13, 1996 || Kitt Peak || Spacewatch || — || align=right | 3.3 km || 
|-id=411 bgcolor=#E9E9E9
| 275411 ||  || — || November 18, 1995 || Kitt Peak || Spacewatch || — || align=right | 2.4 km || 
|-id=412 bgcolor=#d6d6d6
| 275412 ||  || — || February 9, 2005 || Mount Lemmon || Mount Lemmon Survey || — || align=right | 5.4 km || 
|-id=413 bgcolor=#d6d6d6
| 275413 ||  || — || February 2, 2006 || Mount Lemmon || Mount Lemmon Survey || — || align=right | 5.1 km || 
|-id=414 bgcolor=#E9E9E9
| 275414 ||  || — || July 27, 2004 || Siding Spring || SSS || — || align=right | 3.6 km || 
|-id=415 bgcolor=#E9E9E9
| 275415 ||  || — || October 10, 2001 || Palomar || NEAT || — || align=right | 1.3 km || 
|-id=416 bgcolor=#d6d6d6
| 275416 ||  || — || October 29, 2005 || Kitt Peak || Spacewatch || — || align=right | 4.3 km || 
|-id=417 bgcolor=#fefefe
| 275417 ||  || — || September 13, 1998 || Kitt Peak || Spacewatch || — || align=right | 1.0 km || 
|-id=418 bgcolor=#E9E9E9
| 275418 ||  || — || December 29, 2005 || Palomar || NEAT || WAT || align=right | 2.6 km || 
|-id=419 bgcolor=#fefefe
| 275419 ||  || — || May 6, 2008 || Mount Lemmon || Mount Lemmon Survey || ERI || align=right | 2.0 km || 
|-id=420 bgcolor=#E9E9E9
| 275420 ||  || — || August 26, 2005 || Palomar || NEAT || — || align=right | 1.1 km || 
|-id=421 bgcolor=#d6d6d6
| 275421 ||  || — || December 21, 2004 || Catalina || CSS || — || align=right | 4.2 km || 
|-id=422 bgcolor=#d6d6d6
| 275422 ||  || — || December 30, 1999 || Mauna Kea || C. Veillet || — || align=right | 2.3 km || 
|-id=423 bgcolor=#d6d6d6
| 275423 ||  || — || February 20, 2006 || Kitt Peak || Spacewatch || — || align=right | 2.5 km || 
|-id=424 bgcolor=#d6d6d6
| 275424 ||  || — || October 22, 2003 || Apache Point || SDSS || — || align=right | 5.1 km || 
|-id=425 bgcolor=#E9E9E9
| 275425 ||  || — || January 20, 2002 || Anderson Mesa || LONEOS || JUN || align=right | 1.4 km || 
|-id=426 bgcolor=#E9E9E9
| 275426 ||  || — || December 7, 2005 || Kitt Peak || Spacewatch || — || align=right | 3.1 km || 
|-id=427 bgcolor=#E9E9E9
| 275427 ||  || — || November 26, 2005 || Socorro || LINEAR || — || align=right | 2.3 km || 
|-id=428 bgcolor=#d6d6d6
| 275428 ||  || — || February 14, 2005 || Catalina || CSS || EUP || align=right | 4.2 km || 
|-id=429 bgcolor=#d6d6d6
| 275429 ||  || — || December 9, 2004 || Kitt Peak || Spacewatch || — || align=right | 4.1 km || 
|-id=430 bgcolor=#d6d6d6
| 275430 ||  || — || March 31, 2001 || Kitt Peak || Spacewatch || — || align=right | 2.9 km || 
|-id=431 bgcolor=#E9E9E9
| 275431 ||  || — || August 31, 2005 || Kitt Peak || Spacewatch || — || align=right data-sort-value="0.89" | 890 m || 
|-id=432 bgcolor=#E9E9E9
| 275432 ||  || — || February 22, 2007 || Catalina || CSS || ADE || align=right | 2.3 km || 
|-id=433 bgcolor=#d6d6d6
| 275433 ||  || — || November 21, 2003 || Kitt Peak || Spacewatch || — || align=right | 3.3 km || 
|-id=434 bgcolor=#E9E9E9
| 275434 ||  || — || March 13, 2007 || Mount Lemmon || Mount Lemmon Survey || — || align=right | 1.7 km || 
|-id=435 bgcolor=#fefefe
| 275435 ||  || — || April 26, 2000 || Kitt Peak || Spacewatch || NYS || align=right data-sort-value="0.84" | 840 m || 
|-id=436 bgcolor=#d6d6d6
| 275436 ||  || — || February 12, 2000 || Apache Point || SDSS || HYG || align=right | 3.1 km || 
|-id=437 bgcolor=#fefefe
| 275437 ||  || — || November 18, 2006 || Kitt Peak || Spacewatch || — || align=right data-sort-value="0.72" | 720 m || 
|-id=438 bgcolor=#d6d6d6
| 275438 ||  || — || September 27, 2003 || Kitt Peak || Spacewatch || — || align=right | 4.4 km || 
|-id=439 bgcolor=#fefefe
| 275439 ||  || — || March 18, 2001 || Socorro || LINEAR || — || align=right data-sort-value="0.83" | 830 m || 
|-id=440 bgcolor=#d6d6d6
| 275440 ||  || — || May 13, 2007 || Mount Lemmon || Mount Lemmon Survey || — || align=right | 4.4 km || 
|-id=441 bgcolor=#d6d6d6
| 275441 ||  || — || September 17, 2003 || Kitt Peak || Spacewatch || — || align=right | 2.2 km || 
|-id=442 bgcolor=#E9E9E9
| 275442 ||  || — || September 23, 2004 || Kitt Peak || Spacewatch || — || align=right | 1.6 km || 
|-id=443 bgcolor=#d6d6d6
| 275443 ||  || — || March 3, 2006 || Kitt Peak || Spacewatch || — || align=right | 2.0 km || 
|-id=444 bgcolor=#d6d6d6
| 275444 ||  || — || December 19, 2004 || Mount Lemmon || Mount Lemmon Survey || THM || align=right | 2.9 km || 
|-id=445 bgcolor=#E9E9E9
| 275445 ||  || — || September 7, 2008 || Mount Lemmon || Mount Lemmon Survey || MRX || align=right | 1.2 km || 
|-id=446 bgcolor=#FA8072
| 275446 ||  || — || July 28, 2005 || Palomar || NEAT || — || align=right data-sort-value="0.98" | 980 m || 
|-id=447 bgcolor=#d6d6d6
| 275447 ||  || — || December 18, 2004 || Kitt Peak || Spacewatch || HYG || align=right | 4.1 km || 
|-id=448 bgcolor=#fefefe
| 275448 ||  || — || March 18, 2004 || Socorro || LINEAR || — || align=right | 1.2 km || 
|-id=449 bgcolor=#fefefe
| 275449 ||  || — || September 19, 1998 || Apache Point || SDSS || MAS || align=right | 1.1 km || 
|-id=450 bgcolor=#fefefe
| 275450 ||  || — || October 15, 1998 || Kitt Peak || Spacewatch || — || align=right | 1.0 km || 
|-id=451 bgcolor=#E9E9E9
| 275451 ||  || — || March 12, 2007 || Catalina || CSS || — || align=right | 1.8 km || 
|-id=452 bgcolor=#fefefe
| 275452 ||  || — || September 21, 2009 || Mount Lemmon || Mount Lemmon Survey || — || align=right | 1.1 km || 
|-id=453 bgcolor=#d6d6d6
| 275453 ||  || — || February 29, 2000 || Socorro || LINEAR || — || align=right | 4.3 km || 
|-id=454 bgcolor=#d6d6d6
| 275454 ||  || — || January 7, 2006 || Kitt Peak || Spacewatch || — || align=right | 2.8 km || 
|-id=455 bgcolor=#fefefe
| 275455 ||  || — || March 23, 2004 || Socorro || LINEAR || — || align=right | 1.1 km || 
|-id=456 bgcolor=#fefefe
| 275456 ||  || — || March 25, 2000 || Kitt Peak || Spacewatch || NYS || align=right data-sort-value="0.79" | 790 m || 
|-id=457 bgcolor=#fefefe
| 275457 ||  || — || February 28, 2000 || Kitt Peak || Spacewatch || — || align=right | 1.1 km || 
|-id=458 bgcolor=#d6d6d6
| 275458 ||  || — || August 26, 2003 || Cerro Tololo || M. W. Buie || — || align=right | 2.5 km || 
|-id=459 bgcolor=#fefefe
| 275459 ||  || — || January 12, 1996 || Kitt Peak || Spacewatch || — || align=right | 1.1 km || 
|-id=460 bgcolor=#d6d6d6
| 275460 ||  || — || February 21, 1995 || Kitt Peak || Spacewatch || — || align=right | 4.8 km || 
|-id=461 bgcolor=#d6d6d6
| 275461 ||  || — || March 3, 2000 || Kitt Peak || Spacewatch || — || align=right | 3.0 km || 
|-id=462 bgcolor=#d6d6d6
| 275462 ||  || — || March 25, 2006 || Catalina || CSS || — || align=right | 5.8 km || 
|-id=463 bgcolor=#E9E9E9
| 275463 ||  || — || October 27, 2005 || Mount Lemmon || Mount Lemmon Survey || GEF || align=right | 1.7 km || 
|-id=464 bgcolor=#E9E9E9
| 275464 ||  || — || March 14, 2007 || Catalina || CSS || — || align=right | 2.0 km || 
|-id=465 bgcolor=#fefefe
| 275465 ||  || — || August 26, 2009 || Catalina || CSS || — || align=right | 1.3 km || 
|-id=466 bgcolor=#E9E9E9
| 275466 ||  || — || January 31, 1997 || Kitt Peak || Spacewatch || CLO || align=right | 2.8 km || 
|-id=467 bgcolor=#d6d6d6
| 275467 ||  || — || September 4, 2008 || Kitt Peak || Spacewatch || — || align=right | 4.2 km || 
|-id=468 bgcolor=#d6d6d6
| 275468 ||  || — || October 6, 2008 || Mount Lemmon || Mount Lemmon Survey || — || align=right | 3.6 km || 
|-id=469 bgcolor=#d6d6d6
| 275469 ||  || — || November 11, 2004 || Kitt Peak || Spacewatch || — || align=right | 2.9 km || 
|-id=470 bgcolor=#fefefe
| 275470 ||  || — || October 3, 1997 || Kitt Peak || Spacewatch || — || align=right | 1.2 km || 
|-id=471 bgcolor=#d6d6d6
| 275471 ||  || — || February 25, 2000 || Kitt Peak || Spacewatch || — || align=right | 4.0 km || 
|-id=472 bgcolor=#E9E9E9
| 275472 ||  || — || December 14, 2001 || Kitt Peak || Spacewatch || — || align=right | 1.2 km || 
|-id=473 bgcolor=#fefefe
| 275473 ||  || — || October 9, 2005 || Kitt Peak || Spacewatch || MAS || align=right data-sort-value="0.79" | 790 m || 
|-id=474 bgcolor=#d6d6d6
| 275474 ||  || — || March 3, 2006 || Nyukasa || Mount Nyukasa Stn. || KOR || align=right | 1.8 km || 
|-id=475 bgcolor=#fefefe
| 275475 ||  || — || September 11, 2002 || Palomar || NEAT || — || align=right data-sort-value="0.95" | 950 m || 
|-id=476 bgcolor=#E9E9E9
| 275476 ||  || — || March 31, 1998 || Socorro || LINEAR || — || align=right | 2.8 km || 
|-id=477 bgcolor=#d6d6d6
| 275477 ||  || — || October 12, 1998 || Kitt Peak || Spacewatch || — || align=right | 3.2 km || 
|-id=478 bgcolor=#d6d6d6
| 275478 ||  || — || October 8, 1999 || Kitt Peak || Spacewatch || — || align=right | 2.6 km || 
|-id=479 bgcolor=#d6d6d6
| 275479 ||  || — || January 27, 2006 || Mount Lemmon || Mount Lemmon Survey || — || align=right | 3.0 km || 
|-id=480 bgcolor=#E9E9E9
| 275480 ||  || — || January 30, 2006 || Kitt Peak || Spacewatch || — || align=right | 2.6 km || 
|-id=481 bgcolor=#d6d6d6
| 275481 ||  || — || June 17, 2006 || Kitt Peak || Spacewatch || — || align=right | 4.6 km || 
|-id=482 bgcolor=#d6d6d6
| 275482 ||  || — || December 10, 2005 || Kitt Peak || Spacewatch || K-2 || align=right | 1.6 km || 
|-id=483 bgcolor=#fefefe
| 275483 ||  || — || May 27, 2000 || Socorro || LINEAR || — || align=right | 1.1 km || 
|-id=484 bgcolor=#d6d6d6
| 275484 || 4325 P-L || — || September 24, 1960 || Palomar || PLS || URS || align=right | 5.7 km || 
|-id=485 bgcolor=#E9E9E9
| 275485 ||  || — || September 25, 1973 || Palomar || PLS || — || align=right | 2.5 km || 
|-id=486 bgcolor=#E9E9E9
| 275486 ||  || — || October 16, 1977 || Palomar || PLS || — || align=right | 2.1 km || 
|-id=487 bgcolor=#fefefe
| 275487 ||  || — || October 16, 1977 || Palomar || PLS || V || align=right | 1.00 km || 
|-id=488 bgcolor=#d6d6d6
| 275488 ||  || — || October 16, 1977 || Palomar || PLS || EOS || align=right | 2.6 km || 
|-id=489 bgcolor=#fefefe
| 275489 ||  || — || October 16, 1977 || Palomar || PLS || — || align=right | 1.3 km || 
|-id=490 bgcolor=#E9E9E9
| 275490 ||  || — || October 16, 1977 || Palomar || PLS || — || align=right | 3.7 km || 
|-id=491 bgcolor=#E9E9E9
| 275491 || 1960 SR || — || September 24, 1960 || Palomar || L. D. Schmadel, R. M. Stoss || — || align=right | 1.6 km || 
|-id=492 bgcolor=#fefefe
| 275492 ||  || — || October 6, 1991 || Palomar || A. Lowe || — || align=right data-sort-value="0.93" | 930 m || 
|-id=493 bgcolor=#d6d6d6
| 275493 ||  || — || September 28, 1992 || Kitt Peak || Spacewatch || — || align=right | 3.4 km || 
|-id=494 bgcolor=#fefefe
| 275494 || 1993 PA || — || August 10, 1993 || Stroncone || A. Vagnozzi || — || align=right | 1.3 km || 
|-id=495 bgcolor=#E9E9E9
| 275495 ||  || — || January 14, 1994 || Kitt Peak || Spacewatch || — || align=right data-sort-value="0.96" | 960 m || 
|-id=496 bgcolor=#E9E9E9
| 275496 ||  || — || April 11, 1994 || Kitt Peak || Spacewatch || — || align=right | 1.9 km || 
|-id=497 bgcolor=#fefefe
| 275497 ||  || — || October 29, 1994 || Kitt Peak || Spacewatch || — || align=right data-sort-value="0.82" | 820 m || 
|-id=498 bgcolor=#d6d6d6
| 275498 ||  || — || December 1, 1994 || Kitt Peak || Spacewatch || — || align=right | 2.6 km || 
|-id=499 bgcolor=#fefefe
| 275499 ||  || — || May 26, 1995 || Kitt Peak || Spacewatch || H || align=right data-sort-value="0.65" | 650 m || 
|-id=500 bgcolor=#E9E9E9
| 275500 ||  || — || July 27, 1995 || Kitt Peak || Spacewatch || — || align=right | 2.8 km || 
|}

275501–275600 

|-bgcolor=#E9E9E9
| 275501 ||  || — || September 2, 1995 || Kitt Peak || Spacewatch || BRG || align=right | 2.4 km || 
|-id=502 bgcolor=#E9E9E9
| 275502 ||  || — || September 17, 1995 || Kitt Peak || Spacewatch || — || align=right | 2.6 km || 
|-id=503 bgcolor=#E9E9E9
| 275503 ||  || — || September 21, 1995 || Kitt Peak || Spacewatch || EUN || align=right | 1.5 km || 
|-id=504 bgcolor=#fefefe
| 275504 ||  || — || September 22, 1995 || Kitt Peak || Spacewatch || — || align=right data-sort-value="0.80" | 800 m || 
|-id=505 bgcolor=#E9E9E9
| 275505 ||  || — || September 27, 1995 || Kitt Peak || Spacewatch || — || align=right | 1.8 km || 
|-id=506 bgcolor=#E9E9E9
| 275506 ||  || — || September 22, 1995 || Kitt Peak || Spacewatch || — || align=right | 1.8 km || 
|-id=507 bgcolor=#fefefe
| 275507 ||  || — || October 18, 1995 || Kitt Peak || Spacewatch || — || align=right data-sort-value="0.87" | 870 m || 
|-id=508 bgcolor=#fefefe
| 275508 ||  || — || October 28, 1995 || Kitt Peak || Spacewatch || — || align=right data-sort-value="0.98" | 980 m || 
|-id=509 bgcolor=#E9E9E9
| 275509 ||  || — || November 14, 1995 || Kitt Peak || Spacewatch || — || align=right | 2.5 km || 
|-id=510 bgcolor=#E9E9E9
| 275510 ||  || — || November 20, 1995 || Kitt Peak || Spacewatch || WIT || align=right | 1.3 km || 
|-id=511 bgcolor=#fefefe
| 275511 ||  || — || November 23, 1995 || Kitt Peak || Spacewatch || NYS || align=right data-sort-value="0.75" | 750 m || 
|-id=512 bgcolor=#E9E9E9
| 275512 ||  || — || December 16, 1995 || Kitt Peak || Spacewatch || — || align=right | 2.9 km || 
|-id=513 bgcolor=#fefefe
| 275513 ||  || — || January 12, 1996 || Kitt Peak || Spacewatch || NYS || align=right data-sort-value="0.83" | 830 m || 
|-id=514 bgcolor=#fefefe
| 275514 || 1996 LU || — || June 12, 1996 || Prescott || P. G. Comba || CIM || align=right | 3.7 km || 
|-id=515 bgcolor=#fefefe
| 275515 ||  || — || October 3, 1996 || Prescott || P. G. Comba || — || align=right data-sort-value="0.89" | 890 m || 
|-id=516 bgcolor=#E9E9E9
| 275516 ||  || — || November 3, 1996 || Kitt Peak || Spacewatch || MAR || align=right | 1.4 km || 
|-id=517 bgcolor=#E9E9E9
| 275517 ||  || — || December 1, 1996 || Kitt Peak || Spacewatch || — || align=right | 1.5 km || 
|-id=518 bgcolor=#fefefe
| 275518 ||  || — || March 3, 1997 || Kitt Peak || Spacewatch || — || align=right | 1.2 km || 
|-id=519 bgcolor=#fefefe
| 275519 ||  || — || May 6, 1997 || Kitt Peak || Spacewatch || — || align=right | 1.2 km || 
|-id=520 bgcolor=#FA8072
| 275520 ||  || — || June 27, 1997 || Kitt Peak || Spacewatch || — || align=right data-sort-value="0.68" | 680 m || 
|-id=521 bgcolor=#fefefe
| 275521 ||  || — || September 28, 1997 || Kitt Peak || Spacewatch || NYS || align=right data-sort-value="0.78" | 780 m || 
|-id=522 bgcolor=#d6d6d6
| 275522 ||  || — || September 30, 1997 || Kitt Peak || Spacewatch || — || align=right | 4.2 km || 
|-id=523 bgcolor=#fefefe
| 275523 ||  || — || October 4, 1997 || Kitt Peak || Spacewatch || NYS || align=right data-sort-value="0.83" | 830 m || 
|-id=524 bgcolor=#E9E9E9
| 275524 ||  || — || October 2, 1997 || Kitt Peak || Spacewatch || — || align=right | 1.2 km || 
|-id=525 bgcolor=#d6d6d6
| 275525 ||  || — || October 21, 1997 || Kitt Peak || Spacewatch || — || align=right | 3.3 km || 
|-id=526 bgcolor=#d6d6d6
| 275526 ||  || — || November 22, 1997 || Kitt Peak || Spacewatch || URS || align=right | 5.7 km || 
|-id=527 bgcolor=#d6d6d6
| 275527 ||  || — || November 28, 1997 || Kitt Peak || Spacewatch || — || align=right | 3.5 km || 
|-id=528 bgcolor=#E9E9E9
| 275528 || 1998 CM || — || February 3, 1998 || Kleť || M. Tichý, Z. Moravec || — || align=right | 2.8 km || 
|-id=529 bgcolor=#E9E9E9
| 275529 ||  || — || February 22, 1998 || Kitt Peak || Spacewatch || — || align=right | 1.3 km || 
|-id=530 bgcolor=#fefefe
| 275530 ||  || — || March 18, 1998 || Kitt Peak || Spacewatch || — || align=right data-sort-value="0.87" | 870 m || 
|-id=531 bgcolor=#E9E9E9
| 275531 ||  || — || April 18, 1998 || Kitt Peak || Spacewatch || EUN || align=right | 1.6 km || 
|-id=532 bgcolor=#E9E9E9
| 275532 ||  || — || May 18, 1998 || Kitt Peak || Spacewatch || JUN || align=right | 1.5 km || 
|-id=533 bgcolor=#FA8072
| 275533 ||  || — || June 26, 1998 || Socorro || LINEAR || — || align=right | 3.7 km || 
|-id=534 bgcolor=#E9E9E9
| 275534 ||  || — || August 17, 1998 || Socorro || LINEAR || — || align=right | 3.0 km || 
|-id=535 bgcolor=#fefefe
| 275535 ||  || — || August 19, 1998 || Socorro || LINEAR || — || align=right | 1.2 km || 
|-id=536 bgcolor=#fefefe
| 275536 ||  || — || September 14, 1998 || Socorro || LINEAR || — || align=right | 1.8 km || 
|-id=537 bgcolor=#d6d6d6
| 275537 ||  || — || September 15, 1998 || Kitt Peak || Spacewatch || KOR || align=right | 1.8 km || 
|-id=538 bgcolor=#E9E9E9
| 275538 ||  || — || September 14, 1998 || Socorro || LINEAR || — || align=right | 3.3 km || 
|-id=539 bgcolor=#fefefe
| 275539 ||  || — || September 18, 1998 || Kitt Peak || Spacewatch || V || align=right data-sort-value="0.76" | 760 m || 
|-id=540 bgcolor=#d6d6d6
| 275540 ||  || — || September 19, 1998 || Kitt Peak || Spacewatch || KOR || align=right | 1.6 km || 
|-id=541 bgcolor=#fefefe
| 275541 ||  || — || September 24, 1998 || Kitt Peak || Spacewatch || — || align=right data-sort-value="0.99" | 990 m || 
|-id=542 bgcolor=#fefefe
| 275542 ||  || — || September 26, 1998 || Socorro || LINEAR || V || align=right data-sort-value="0.89" | 890 m || 
|-id=543 bgcolor=#fefefe
| 275543 ||  || — || September 26, 1998 || Socorro || LINEAR || — || align=right | 1.2 km || 
|-id=544 bgcolor=#fefefe
| 275544 ||  || — || September 16, 1998 || Anderson Mesa || LONEOS || ERI || align=right | 1.9 km || 
|-id=545 bgcolor=#FFC2E0
| 275545 ||  || — || October 19, 1998 || Socorro || LINEAR || AMO +1kmcritical || align=right data-sort-value="0.85" | 850 m || 
|-id=546 bgcolor=#E9E9E9
| 275546 ||  || — || October 20, 1998 || Caussols || ODAS || — || align=right | 1.4 km || 
|-id=547 bgcolor=#fefefe
| 275547 ||  || — || November 15, 1998 || Kitt Peak || Spacewatch || ERI || align=right | 1.9 km || 
|-id=548 bgcolor=#E9E9E9
| 275548 ||  || — || December 22, 1998 || Kitt Peak || Spacewatch || — || align=right | 2.0 km || 
|-id=549 bgcolor=#d6d6d6
| 275549 ||  || — || January 8, 1999 || Kitt Peak || Spacewatch || — || align=right | 4.2 km || 
|-id=550 bgcolor=#E9E9E9
| 275550 ||  || — || February 14, 1999 || Caussols || ODAS || — || align=right | 1.4 km || 
|-id=551 bgcolor=#d6d6d6
| 275551 ||  || — || March 14, 1999 || Kitt Peak || Spacewatch || — || align=right | 4.8 km || 
|-id=552 bgcolor=#d6d6d6
| 275552 ||  || — || March 20, 1999 || Apache Point || SDSS || TIR || align=right | 3.4 km || 
|-id=553 bgcolor=#d6d6d6
| 275553 ||  || — || March 20, 1999 || Apache Point || SDSS || — || align=right | 4.0 km || 
|-id=554 bgcolor=#E9E9E9
| 275554 ||  || — || July 14, 1999 || Socorro || LINEAR || — || align=right | 1.4 km || 
|-id=555 bgcolor=#E9E9E9
| 275555 ||  || — || July 12, 1999 || Socorro || LINEAR || — || align=right | 1.9 km || 
|-id=556 bgcolor=#E9E9E9
| 275556 ||  || — || September 8, 1999 || Socorro || LINEAR || — || align=right | 2.1 km || 
|-id=557 bgcolor=#E9E9E9
| 275557 ||  || — || September 8, 1999 || Socorro || LINEAR || — || align=right | 2.6 km || 
|-id=558 bgcolor=#FFC2E0
| 275558 ||  || — || September 5, 1999 || Steward Observatory || A. Gleason || AMO || align=right data-sort-value="0.56" | 560 m || 
|-id=559 bgcolor=#E9E9E9
| 275559 ||  || — || September 7, 1999 || Socorro || LINEAR || — || align=right | 2.0 km || 
|-id=560 bgcolor=#E9E9E9
| 275560 ||  || — || September 7, 1999 || Socorro || LINEAR || — || align=right | 2.1 km || 
|-id=561 bgcolor=#fefefe
| 275561 ||  || — || September 9, 1999 || Socorro || LINEAR || — || align=right | 1.1 km || 
|-id=562 bgcolor=#E9E9E9
| 275562 ||  || — || September 9, 1999 || Socorro || LINEAR || JUN || align=right | 1.3 km || 
|-id=563 bgcolor=#fefefe
| 275563 ||  || — || September 9, 1999 || Socorro || LINEAR || FLO || align=right data-sort-value="0.86" | 860 m || 
|-id=564 bgcolor=#E9E9E9
| 275564 ||  || — || September 8, 1999 || Catalina || CSS || JUN || align=right | 1.5 km || 
|-id=565 bgcolor=#E9E9E9
| 275565 ||  || — || September 27, 1999 || Ondřejov || L. Kotková || ADE || align=right | 2.6 km || 
|-id=566 bgcolor=#E9E9E9
| 275566 ||  || — || October 7, 1999 || Višnjan Observatory || K. Korlević, M. Jurić || — || align=right | 2.4 km || 
|-id=567 bgcolor=#E9E9E9
| 275567 ||  || — || October 2, 1999 || Socorro || LINEAR || JUN || align=right | 1.5 km || 
|-id=568 bgcolor=#FA8072
| 275568 ||  || — || October 1, 1999 || Catalina || CSS || — || align=right data-sort-value="0.76" | 760 m || 
|-id=569 bgcolor=#E9E9E9
| 275569 ||  || — || October 3, 1999 || Kitt Peak || Spacewatch || MRX || align=right | 1.2 km || 
|-id=570 bgcolor=#E9E9E9
| 275570 ||  || — || October 7, 1999 || Kitt Peak || Spacewatch || — || align=right | 1.8 km || 
|-id=571 bgcolor=#d6d6d6
| 275571 ||  || — || October 7, 1999 || Kitt Peak || Spacewatch || — || align=right | 2.9 km || 
|-id=572 bgcolor=#E9E9E9
| 275572 ||  || — || October 9, 1999 || Kitt Peak || Spacewatch || EUN || align=right | 2.0 km || 
|-id=573 bgcolor=#d6d6d6
| 275573 ||  || — || October 10, 1999 || Kitt Peak || Spacewatch || CHA || align=right | 2.8 km || 
|-id=574 bgcolor=#E9E9E9
| 275574 ||  || — || October 13, 1999 || Kitt Peak || Spacewatch || GEF || align=right | 2.0 km || 
|-id=575 bgcolor=#E9E9E9
| 275575 ||  || — || October 2, 1999 || Socorro || LINEAR || — || align=right | 2.8 km || 
|-id=576 bgcolor=#E9E9E9
| 275576 ||  || — || October 9, 1999 || Socorro || LINEAR || — || align=right | 3.0 km || 
|-id=577 bgcolor=#E9E9E9
| 275577 ||  || — || October 10, 1999 || Socorro || LINEAR || — || align=right | 1.6 km || 
|-id=578 bgcolor=#E9E9E9
| 275578 ||  || — || October 13, 1999 || Socorro || LINEAR || — || align=right | 2.2 km || 
|-id=579 bgcolor=#d6d6d6
| 275579 ||  || — || October 15, 1999 || Socorro || LINEAR || — || align=right | 4.5 km || 
|-id=580 bgcolor=#fefefe
| 275580 ||  || — || October 1, 1999 || Kitt Peak || Spacewatch || — || align=right data-sort-value="0.71" | 710 m || 
|-id=581 bgcolor=#E9E9E9
| 275581 ||  || — || October 13, 1999 || Socorro || LINEAR || — || align=right | 2.2 km || 
|-id=582 bgcolor=#E9E9E9
| 275582 ||  || — || October 9, 1999 || Socorro || LINEAR || — || align=right | 3.6 km || 
|-id=583 bgcolor=#fefefe
| 275583 ||  || — || October 9, 1999 || Socorro || LINEAR || — || align=right data-sort-value="0.73" | 730 m || 
|-id=584 bgcolor=#E9E9E9
| 275584 ||  || — || October 12, 1999 || Kitt Peak || Spacewatch || — || align=right | 1.6 km || 
|-id=585 bgcolor=#d6d6d6
| 275585 ||  || — || October 31, 1999 || Kitt Peak || Spacewatch || — || align=right | 3.0 km || 
|-id=586 bgcolor=#fefefe
| 275586 ||  || — || October 16, 1999 || Kitt Peak || Spacewatch || NYS || align=right data-sort-value="0.76" | 760 m || 
|-id=587 bgcolor=#E9E9E9
| 275587 ||  || — || October 16, 1999 || Kitt Peak || Spacewatch || — || align=right | 2.8 km || 
|-id=588 bgcolor=#fefefe
| 275588 ||  || — || November 1, 1999 || Kitt Peak || Spacewatch || — || align=right data-sort-value="0.61" | 610 m || 
|-id=589 bgcolor=#FA8072
| 275589 ||  || — || November 10, 1999 || Višnjan || K. Korlević || — || align=right data-sort-value="0.57" | 570 m || 
|-id=590 bgcolor=#E9E9E9
| 275590 ||  || — || November 4, 1999 || Socorro || LINEAR || — || align=right | 3.9 km || 
|-id=591 bgcolor=#E9E9E9
| 275591 ||  || — || November 5, 1999 || Kitt Peak || Spacewatch || HNA || align=right | 2.8 km || 
|-id=592 bgcolor=#d6d6d6
| 275592 ||  || — || November 1, 1999 || Kitt Peak || Spacewatch || CRO || align=right | 3.5 km || 
|-id=593 bgcolor=#fefefe
| 275593 ||  || — || November 9, 1999 || Socorro || LINEAR || NYS || align=right data-sort-value="0.81" | 810 m || 
|-id=594 bgcolor=#d6d6d6
| 275594 ||  || — || November 9, 1999 || Socorro || LINEAR || TRP || align=right | 3.8 km || 
|-id=595 bgcolor=#fefefe
| 275595 ||  || — || November 6, 1999 || Kitt Peak || Spacewatch || FLO || align=right data-sort-value="0.70" | 700 m || 
|-id=596 bgcolor=#d6d6d6
| 275596 ||  || — || November 11, 1999 || Kitt Peak || Spacewatch || — || align=right | 4.0 km || 
|-id=597 bgcolor=#E9E9E9
| 275597 ||  || — || November 10, 1999 || Kitt Peak || Spacewatch || — || align=right | 2.7 km || 
|-id=598 bgcolor=#fefefe
| 275598 ||  || — || November 12, 1999 || Socorro || LINEAR || — || align=right | 1.1 km || 
|-id=599 bgcolor=#E9E9E9
| 275599 ||  || — || November 14, 1999 || Socorro || LINEAR || — || align=right | 2.7 km || 
|-id=600 bgcolor=#fefefe
| 275600 ||  || — || November 14, 1999 || Socorro || LINEAR || fast? || align=right | 1.2 km || 
|}

275601–275700 

|-bgcolor=#E9E9E9
| 275601 ||  || — || November 3, 1999 || Anderson Mesa || LONEOS || — || align=right | 3.4 km || 
|-id=602 bgcolor=#d6d6d6
| 275602 ||  || — || November 12, 1999 || Socorro || LINEAR || — || align=right | 1.9 km || 
|-id=603 bgcolor=#E9E9E9
| 275603 ||  || — || November 12, 1999 || Socorro || LINEAR || MRX || align=right | 1.4 km || 
|-id=604 bgcolor=#E9E9E9
| 275604 ||  || — || November 28, 1999 || Kitt Peak || Spacewatch || — || align=right | 3.0 km || 
|-id=605 bgcolor=#fefefe
| 275605 ||  || — || December 7, 1999 || Socorro || LINEAR || — || align=right data-sort-value="0.86" | 860 m || 
|-id=606 bgcolor=#E9E9E9
| 275606 ||  || — || December 7, 1999 || Socorro || LINEAR || — || align=right | 3.6 km || 
|-id=607 bgcolor=#E9E9E9
| 275607 ||  || — || December 7, 1999 || Socorro || LINEAR || — || align=right | 3.4 km || 
|-id=608 bgcolor=#fefefe
| 275608 ||  || — || December 7, 1999 || Kitt Peak || Spacewatch || — || align=right data-sort-value="0.72" | 720 m || 
|-id=609 bgcolor=#d6d6d6
| 275609 ||  || — || December 7, 1999 || Kitt Peak || Spacewatch || — || align=right | 3.4 km || 
|-id=610 bgcolor=#fefefe
| 275610 ||  || — || December 13, 1999 || Kitt Peak || Spacewatch || FLO || align=right data-sort-value="0.77" | 770 m || 
|-id=611 bgcolor=#FFC2E0
| 275611 ||  || — || December 12, 1999 || Catalina || CSS || AMO +1km || align=right | 2.4 km || 
|-id=612 bgcolor=#E9E9E9
| 275612 ||  || — || December 30, 1999 || Socorro || LINEAR || — || align=right | 2.4 km || 
|-id=613 bgcolor=#fefefe
| 275613 ||  || — || January 3, 2000 || Socorro || LINEAR || NYS || align=right data-sort-value="0.83" | 830 m || 
|-id=614 bgcolor=#fefefe
| 275614 ||  || — || January 6, 2000 || Socorro || LINEAR || PHO || align=right | 1.2 km || 
|-id=615 bgcolor=#fefefe
| 275615 ||  || — || January 4, 2000 || Socorro || LINEAR || — || align=right data-sort-value="0.98" | 980 m || 
|-id=616 bgcolor=#E9E9E9
| 275616 ||  || — || January 8, 2000 || Kitt Peak || Spacewatch || — || align=right | 3.0 km || 
|-id=617 bgcolor=#d6d6d6
| 275617 ||  || — || January 12, 2000 || Kitt Peak || Spacewatch || CHA || align=right | 1.8 km || 
|-id=618 bgcolor=#B88A00
| 275618 ||  || — || January 7, 2000 || Anderson Mesa || LONEOS || Tj (2.74) || align=right | 8.9 km || 
|-id=619 bgcolor=#d6d6d6
| 275619 ||  || — || January 29, 2000 || Kitt Peak || Spacewatch || — || align=right | 2.4 km || 
|-id=620 bgcolor=#d6d6d6
| 275620 ||  || — || February 8, 2000 || Kitt Peak || Spacewatch || — || align=right | 3.2 km || 
|-id=621 bgcolor=#d6d6d6
| 275621 ||  || — || February 5, 2000 || Kitt Peak || M. W. Buie || — || align=right | 3.1 km || 
|-id=622 bgcolor=#fefefe
| 275622 ||  || — || February 3, 2000 || Kitt Peak || Spacewatch || — || align=right data-sort-value="0.74" | 740 m || 
|-id=623 bgcolor=#fefefe
| 275623 ||  || — || February 2, 2000 || Kitt Peak || Spacewatch || PHO || align=right | 1.5 km || 
|-id=624 bgcolor=#fefefe
| 275624 ||  || — || February 26, 2000 || Kitt Peak || Spacewatch || MAS || align=right data-sort-value="0.85" | 850 m || 
|-id=625 bgcolor=#fefefe
| 275625 ||  || — || February 27, 2000 || Kitt Peak || Spacewatch || PHO || align=right | 1.6 km || 
|-id=626 bgcolor=#fefefe
| 275626 ||  || — || February 29, 2000 || Socorro || LINEAR || PHO || align=right | 1.5 km || 
|-id=627 bgcolor=#fefefe
| 275627 ||  || — || February 27, 2000 || Kitt Peak || Spacewatch || MAS || align=right data-sort-value="0.71" | 710 m || 
|-id=628 bgcolor=#d6d6d6
| 275628 ||  || — || February 29, 2000 || Socorro || LINEAR || — || align=right | 2.9 km || 
|-id=629 bgcolor=#fefefe
| 275629 ||  || — || February 29, 2000 || Socorro || LINEAR || — || align=right | 1.1 km || 
|-id=630 bgcolor=#fefefe
| 275630 ||  || — || March 4, 2000 || Socorro || LINEAR || — || align=right data-sort-value="0.92" | 920 m || 
|-id=631 bgcolor=#d6d6d6
| 275631 ||  || — || March 4, 2000 || Socorro || LINEAR || — || align=right | 4.2 km || 
|-id=632 bgcolor=#fefefe
| 275632 ||  || — || March 3, 2000 || Socorro || LINEAR || H || align=right | 1.2 km || 
|-id=633 bgcolor=#fefefe
| 275633 ||  || — || March 10, 2000 || Kitt Peak || Spacewatch || — || align=right data-sort-value="0.95" | 950 m || 
|-id=634 bgcolor=#fefefe
| 275634 ||  || — || March 11, 2000 || Anderson Mesa || LONEOS || ERI || align=right | 2.3 km || 
|-id=635 bgcolor=#fefefe
| 275635 ||  || — || March 6, 2000 || Haleakala || NEAT || NYS || align=right data-sort-value="0.95" | 950 m || 
|-id=636 bgcolor=#d6d6d6
| 275636 ||  || — || March 5, 2000 || Cerro Tololo || DLS || — || align=right | 3.2 km || 
|-id=637 bgcolor=#d6d6d6
| 275637 ||  || — || March 3, 2000 || Apache Point || SDSS || — || align=right | 3.5 km || 
|-id=638 bgcolor=#fefefe
| 275638 ||  || — || March 29, 2000 || Kitt Peak || Spacewatch || — || align=right | 1.2 km || 
|-id=639 bgcolor=#d6d6d6
| 275639 ||  || — || March 29, 2000 || Socorro || LINEAR || — || align=right | 3.9 km || 
|-id=640 bgcolor=#fefefe
| 275640 ||  || — || April 5, 2000 || Socorro || LINEAR || V || align=right data-sort-value="0.84" | 840 m || 
|-id=641 bgcolor=#fefefe
| 275641 ||  || — || April 5, 2000 || Socorro || LINEAR || MAS || align=right data-sort-value="0.94" | 940 m || 
|-id=642 bgcolor=#d6d6d6
| 275642 ||  || — || April 5, 2000 || Socorro || LINEAR || — || align=right | 4.5 km || 
|-id=643 bgcolor=#fefefe
| 275643 ||  || — || April 5, 2000 || Socorro || LINEAR || — || align=right data-sort-value="0.82" | 820 m || 
|-id=644 bgcolor=#d6d6d6
| 275644 ||  || — || April 5, 2000 || Socorro || LINEAR || — || align=right | 3.2 km || 
|-id=645 bgcolor=#d6d6d6
| 275645 ||  || — || April 3, 2000 || Socorro || LINEAR || — || align=right | 3.2 km || 
|-id=646 bgcolor=#E9E9E9
| 275646 ||  || — || April 6, 2000 || Socorro || LINEAR || RAF || align=right | 1.7 km || 
|-id=647 bgcolor=#d6d6d6
| 275647 ||  || — || April 7, 2000 || Socorro || LINEAR || — || align=right | 4.6 km || 
|-id=648 bgcolor=#fefefe
| 275648 ||  || — || April 5, 2000 || Kitt Peak || Spacewatch || NYS || align=right data-sort-value="0.69" | 690 m || 
|-id=649 bgcolor=#fefefe
| 275649 ||  || — || April 7, 2000 || Kitt Peak || Spacewatch || NYS || align=right data-sort-value="0.66" | 660 m || 
|-id=650 bgcolor=#fefefe
| 275650 ||  || — || April 5, 2000 || Socorro || LINEAR || NYS || align=right data-sort-value="0.83" | 830 m || 
|-id=651 bgcolor=#fefefe
| 275651 ||  || — || April 3, 2000 || Anderson Mesa || LONEOS || — || align=right data-sort-value="0.98" | 980 m || 
|-id=652 bgcolor=#d6d6d6
| 275652 ||  || — || April 27, 2000 || Kitt Peak || Spacewatch || — || align=right | 3.3 km || 
|-id=653 bgcolor=#fefefe
| 275653 ||  || — || April 29, 2000 || Kitt Peak || Spacewatch || NYS || align=right data-sort-value="0.69" | 690 m || 
|-id=654 bgcolor=#d6d6d6
| 275654 ||  || — || April 25, 2000 || Kitt Peak || Spacewatch || — || align=right | 3.5 km || 
|-id=655 bgcolor=#fefefe
| 275655 ||  || — || May 26, 2000 || Socorro || LINEAR || PHO || align=right | 1.3 km || 
|-id=656 bgcolor=#d6d6d6
| 275656 ||  || — || May 27, 2000 || Socorro || LINEAR || Tj (2.99) || align=right | 5.0 km || 
|-id=657 bgcolor=#fefefe
| 275657 ||  || — || May 28, 2000 || Socorro || LINEAR || NYS || align=right data-sort-value="0.71" | 710 m || 
|-id=658 bgcolor=#fefefe
| 275658 ||  || — || May 28, 2000 || Socorro || LINEAR || — || align=right | 1.2 km || 
|-id=659 bgcolor=#d6d6d6
| 275659 ||  || — || May 28, 2000 || Socorro || LINEAR || — || align=right | 3.9 km || 
|-id=660 bgcolor=#fefefe
| 275660 ||  || — || May 27, 2000 || Socorro || LINEAR || — || align=right | 1.0 km || 
|-id=661 bgcolor=#d6d6d6
| 275661 ||  || — || June 1, 2000 || Kitt Peak || Spacewatch || LIX || align=right | 5.7 km || 
|-id=662 bgcolor=#d6d6d6
| 275662 ||  || — || June 6, 2000 || Kitt Peak || Spacewatch || MEL || align=right | 5.2 km || 
|-id=663 bgcolor=#d6d6d6
| 275663 ||  || — || June 1, 2000 || Socorro || LINEAR || — || align=right | 6.0 km || 
|-id=664 bgcolor=#E9E9E9
| 275664 ||  || — || June 4, 2000 || Kitt Peak || Spacewatch || ADE || align=right | 2.3 km || 
|-id=665 bgcolor=#E9E9E9
| 275665 ||  || — || July 5, 2000 || Anderson Mesa || LONEOS || — || align=right | 2.4 km || 
|-id=666 bgcolor=#E9E9E9
| 275666 ||  || — || July 24, 2000 || Socorro || LINEAR || RAF || align=right | 1.4 km || 
|-id=667 bgcolor=#E9E9E9
| 275667 ||  || — || August 2, 2000 || Socorro || LINEAR || ADE || align=right | 3.7 km || 
|-id=668 bgcolor=#E9E9E9
| 275668 ||  || — || August 24, 2000 || Socorro || LINEAR || — || align=right | 1.7 km || 
|-id=669 bgcolor=#fefefe
| 275669 ||  || — || August 25, 2000 || Višnjan || K. Korlević || — || align=right | 2.0 km || 
|-id=670 bgcolor=#E9E9E9
| 275670 ||  || — || August 25, 2000 || Socorro || LINEAR || — || align=right | 2.0 km || 
|-id=671 bgcolor=#E9E9E9
| 275671 ||  || — || August 25, 2000 || Socorro || LINEAR || — || align=right | 3.2 km || 
|-id=672 bgcolor=#E9E9E9
| 275672 ||  || — || August 29, 2000 || Socorro || LINEAR || — || align=right | 1.1 km || 
|-id=673 bgcolor=#E9E9E9
| 275673 ||  || — || August 31, 2000 || Socorro || LINEAR || — || align=right | 2.1 km || 
|-id=674 bgcolor=#E9E9E9
| 275674 ||  || — || August 31, 2000 || Socorro || LINEAR || RAF || align=right | 1.3 km || 
|-id=675 bgcolor=#fefefe
| 275675 ||  || — || August 31, 2000 || Socorro || LINEAR || FLO || align=right data-sort-value="0.67" | 670 m || 
|-id=676 bgcolor=#fefefe
| 275676 ||  || — || August 27, 2000 || Cerro Tololo || M. W. Buie || — || align=right data-sort-value="0.94" | 940 m || 
|-id=677 bgcolor=#FFC2E0
| 275677 ||  || — || September 2, 2000 || Socorro || LINEAR || APOPHA || align=right data-sort-value="0.56" | 560 m || 
|-id=678 bgcolor=#E9E9E9
| 275678 ||  || — || September 1, 2000 || Socorro || LINEAR || CLO || align=right | 2.3 km || 
|-id=679 bgcolor=#E9E9E9
| 275679 ||  || — || September 1, 2000 || Socorro || LINEAR || — || align=right | 1.9 km || 
|-id=680 bgcolor=#E9E9E9
| 275680 ||  || — || September 23, 2000 || Socorro || LINEAR || GEF || align=right | 1.3 km || 
|-id=681 bgcolor=#C2FFFF
| 275681 ||  || — || September 24, 2000 || Socorro || LINEAR || L5 || align=right | 20 km || 
|-id=682 bgcolor=#C2FFFF
| 275682 ||  || — || September 23, 2000 || Socorro || LINEAR || L5 || align=right | 14 km || 
|-id=683 bgcolor=#fefefe
| 275683 ||  || — || September 24, 2000 || Socorro || LINEAR || — || align=right | 1.1 km || 
|-id=684 bgcolor=#E9E9E9
| 275684 ||  || — || September 24, 2000 || Socorro || LINEAR || — || align=right | 1.1 km || 
|-id=685 bgcolor=#E9E9E9
| 275685 ||  || — || September 24, 2000 || Socorro || LINEAR || EUN || align=right | 1.5 km || 
|-id=686 bgcolor=#E9E9E9
| 275686 ||  || — || September 24, 2000 || Socorro || LINEAR || — || align=right | 1.3 km || 
|-id=687 bgcolor=#E9E9E9
| 275687 ||  || — || September 23, 2000 || Socorro || LINEAR || EUN || align=right | 1.3 km || 
|-id=688 bgcolor=#fefefe
| 275688 ||  || — || September 23, 2000 || Socorro || LINEAR || SUL || align=right | 3.0 km || 
|-id=689 bgcolor=#E9E9E9
| 275689 ||  || — || September 23, 2000 || Socorro || LINEAR || — || align=right | 2.3 km || 
|-id=690 bgcolor=#E9E9E9
| 275690 ||  || — || September 27, 2000 || Socorro || LINEAR || — || align=right | 2.8 km || 
|-id=691 bgcolor=#E9E9E9
| 275691 ||  || — || September 23, 2000 || Socorro || LINEAR || — || align=right | 1.7 km || 
|-id=692 bgcolor=#E9E9E9
| 275692 ||  || — || September 28, 2000 || Socorro || LINEAR || MAR || align=right | 1.4 km || 
|-id=693 bgcolor=#E9E9E9
| 275693 ||  || — || September 24, 2000 || Socorro || LINEAR || — || align=right | 1.1 km || 
|-id=694 bgcolor=#E9E9E9
| 275694 ||  || — || September 23, 2000 || Socorro || LINEAR || EUN || align=right | 1.5 km || 
|-id=695 bgcolor=#E9E9E9
| 275695 ||  || — || September 28, 2000 || Socorro || LINEAR || — || align=right | 1.8 km || 
|-id=696 bgcolor=#d6d6d6
| 275696 ||  || — || September 23, 2000 || Anderson Mesa || LONEOS || LAU || align=right | 1.1 km || 
|-id=697 bgcolor=#E9E9E9
| 275697 ||  || — || October 1, 2000 || Socorro || LINEAR || — || align=right | 2.0 km || 
|-id=698 bgcolor=#E9E9E9
| 275698 ||  || — || October 1, 2000 || Socorro || LINEAR || — || align=right | 1.5 km || 
|-id=699 bgcolor=#E9E9E9
| 275699 ||  || — || October 2, 2000 || Anderson Mesa || LONEOS || — || align=right | 1.9 km || 
|-id=700 bgcolor=#E9E9E9
| 275700 ||  || — || October 1, 2000 || Socorro || LINEAR || — || align=right | 1.7 km || 
|}

275701–275800 

|-bgcolor=#E9E9E9
| 275701 ||  || — || October 25, 2000 || Socorro || LINEAR || — || align=right | 2.7 km || 
|-id=702 bgcolor=#E9E9E9
| 275702 ||  || — || October 24, 2000 || Socorro || LINEAR || RAF || align=right | 1.7 km || 
|-id=703 bgcolor=#E9E9E9
| 275703 ||  || — || October 25, 2000 || Socorro || LINEAR || — || align=right | 1.8 km || 
|-id=704 bgcolor=#E9E9E9
| 275704 ||  || — || November 1, 2000 || Socorro || LINEAR || XIZ || align=right | 1.7 km || 
|-id=705 bgcolor=#E9E9E9
| 275705 ||  || — || November 1, 2000 || Socorro || LINEAR || MAR || align=right | 1.7 km || 
|-id=706 bgcolor=#E9E9E9
| 275706 ||  || — || November 1, 2000 || Socorro || LINEAR || — || align=right | 2.2 km || 
|-id=707 bgcolor=#E9E9E9
| 275707 ||  || — || November 25, 2000 || Kitt Peak || Spacewatch || — || align=right | 1.4 km || 
|-id=708 bgcolor=#E9E9E9
| 275708 ||  || — || October 1, 1995 || Kitt Peak || Spacewatch || HEN || align=right | 1.5 km || 
|-id=709 bgcolor=#E9E9E9
| 275709 ||  || — || November 20, 2000 || Socorro || LINEAR || — || align=right | 2.0 km || 
|-id=710 bgcolor=#E9E9E9
| 275710 ||  || — || November 27, 2000 || Kitt Peak || Spacewatch || EUN || align=right | 1.9 km || 
|-id=711 bgcolor=#d6d6d6
| 275711 ||  || — || November 28, 2000 || Kitt Peak || Spacewatch || — || align=right | 2.8 km || 
|-id=712 bgcolor=#E9E9E9
| 275712 ||  || — || November 19, 2000 || Kitt Peak || Spacewatch || EUN || align=right | 1.7 km || 
|-id=713 bgcolor=#E9E9E9
| 275713 ||  || — || November 21, 2000 || Socorro || LINEAR || — || align=right | 2.0 km || 
|-id=714 bgcolor=#FFC2E0
| 275714 ||  || — || December 19, 2000 || Anderson Mesa || LONEOS || APO || align=right data-sort-value="0.63" | 630 m || 
|-id=715 bgcolor=#fefefe
| 275715 ||  || — || December 30, 2000 || Socorro || LINEAR || H || align=right | 1.2 km || 
|-id=716 bgcolor=#E9E9E9
| 275716 ||  || — || December 30, 2000 || Socorro || LINEAR || EUN || align=right | 2.5 km || 
|-id=717 bgcolor=#E9E9E9
| 275717 ||  || — || December 30, 2000 || Socorro || LINEAR || AEO || align=right | 2.7 km || 
|-id=718 bgcolor=#d6d6d6
| 275718 ||  || — || December 30, 2000 || Socorro || LINEAR || — || align=right | 4.1 km || 
|-id=719 bgcolor=#E9E9E9
| 275719 ||  || — || December 30, 2000 || Socorro || LINEAR || — || align=right | 4.3 km || 
|-id=720 bgcolor=#E9E9E9
| 275720 ||  || — || December 29, 2000 || Kitt Peak || Spacewatch || — || align=right | 2.6 km || 
|-id=721 bgcolor=#E9E9E9
| 275721 ||  || — || January 2, 2001 || Socorro || LINEAR || — || align=right | 2.9 km || 
|-id=722 bgcolor=#fefefe
| 275722 ||  || — || January 4, 2001 || Socorro || LINEAR || H || align=right data-sort-value="0.86" | 860 m || 
|-id=723 bgcolor=#E9E9E9
| 275723 ||  || — || January 3, 2001 || Socorro || LINEAR || — || align=right | 2.6 km || 
|-id=724 bgcolor=#E9E9E9
| 275724 ||  || — || January 3, 2001 || Socorro || LINEAR || — || align=right | 2.9 km || 
|-id=725 bgcolor=#E9E9E9
| 275725 ||  || — || January 4, 2001 || Socorro || LINEAR || — || align=right | 2.3 km || 
|-id=726 bgcolor=#fefefe
| 275726 ||  || — || January 16, 2001 || Kitt Peak || Spacewatch || — || align=right data-sort-value="0.71" | 710 m || 
|-id=727 bgcolor=#E9E9E9
| 275727 ||  || — || January 30, 2001 || Junk Bond || Junk Bond Obs. || — || align=right | 2.6 km || 
|-id=728 bgcolor=#d6d6d6
| 275728 ||  || — || January 29, 2001 || Kvistaberg || UDAS || — || align=right | 5.6 km || 
|-id=729 bgcolor=#fefefe
| 275729 ||  || — || February 1, 2001 || Socorro || LINEAR || — || align=right | 1.2 km || 
|-id=730 bgcolor=#E9E9E9
| 275730 ||  || — || February 2, 2001 || Anderson Mesa || LONEOS || — || align=right | 4.0 km || 
|-id=731 bgcolor=#d6d6d6
| 275731 ||  || — || February 16, 2001 || Kitt Peak || Spacewatch || — || align=right | 2.2 km || 
|-id=732 bgcolor=#E9E9E9
| 275732 ||  || — || February 20, 2001 || Haleakala || NEAT || — || align=right | 1.9 km || 
|-id=733 bgcolor=#E9E9E9
| 275733 ||  || — || February 16, 2001 || Socorro || LINEAR || — || align=right | 3.9 km || 
|-id=734 bgcolor=#fefefe
| 275734 ||  || — || February 17, 2001 || Socorro || LINEAR || FLO || align=right data-sort-value="0.81" | 810 m || 
|-id=735 bgcolor=#fefefe
| 275735 ||  || — || March 4, 2001 || Socorro || LINEAR || H || align=right | 1.3 km || 
|-id=736 bgcolor=#FA8072
| 275736 ||  || — || March 23, 2001 || Anderson Mesa || LONEOS || — || align=right data-sort-value="0.89" | 890 m || 
|-id=737 bgcolor=#d6d6d6
| 275737 ||  || — || March 21, 2001 || Kitt Peak || Spacewatch || — || align=right | 2.2 km || 
|-id=738 bgcolor=#fefefe
| 275738 ||  || — || April 15, 2001 || Anderson Mesa || LONEOS || — || align=right data-sort-value="0.98" | 980 m || 
|-id=739 bgcolor=#d6d6d6
| 275739 ||  || — || April 15, 2001 || Socorro || LINEAR || — || align=right | 4.3 km || 
|-id=740 bgcolor=#FA8072
| 275740 ||  || — || April 17, 2001 || Anderson Mesa || LONEOS || critical || align=right data-sort-value="0.57" | 570 m || 
|-id=741 bgcolor=#d6d6d6
| 275741 ||  || — || April 18, 2001 || Kitt Peak || Spacewatch || — || align=right | 3.2 km || 
|-id=742 bgcolor=#FA8072
| 275742 ||  || — || April 23, 2001 || Socorro || LINEAR || PHO || align=right | 1.6 km || 
|-id=743 bgcolor=#E9E9E9
| 275743 ||  || — || April 24, 2001 || Kitt Peak || Spacewatch || — || align=right | 1.2 km || 
|-id=744 bgcolor=#fefefe
| 275744 ||  || — || April 16, 2001 || Kitt Peak || Spacewatch || FLO || align=right data-sort-value="0.85" | 850 m || 
|-id=745 bgcolor=#fefefe
| 275745 ||  || — || May 22, 2001 || Anderson Mesa || LONEOS || PHO || align=right | 1.6 km || 
|-id=746 bgcolor=#fefefe
| 275746 ||  || — || June 15, 2001 || Palomar || NEAT || — || align=right | 1.3 km || 
|-id=747 bgcolor=#d6d6d6
| 275747 ||  || — || June 22, 2001 || Palomar || NEAT || — || align=right | 4.3 km || 
|-id=748 bgcolor=#d6d6d6
| 275748 ||  || — || June 20, 2001 || Palomar || NEAT || — || align=right | 4.0 km || 
|-id=749 bgcolor=#FA8072
| 275749 ||  || — || July 19, 2001 || Palomar || NEAT || — || align=right | 1.1 km || 
|-id=750 bgcolor=#d6d6d6
| 275750 ||  || — || July 18, 2001 || Palomar || NEAT || — || align=right | 3.7 km || 
|-id=751 bgcolor=#d6d6d6
| 275751 ||  || — || July 19, 2001 || Palomar || NEAT || — || align=right | 4.0 km || 
|-id=752 bgcolor=#fefefe
| 275752 ||  || — || July 19, 2001 || Palomar || NEAT || V || align=right data-sort-value="0.72" | 720 m || 
|-id=753 bgcolor=#fefefe
| 275753 ||  || — || July 19, 2001 || Palomar || NEAT || PHO || align=right | 1.8 km || 
|-id=754 bgcolor=#d6d6d6
| 275754 ||  || — || July 20, 2001 || Palomar || NEAT || — || align=right | 4.5 km || 
|-id=755 bgcolor=#d6d6d6
| 275755 ||  || — || July 21, 2001 || Palomar || NEAT || — || align=right | 4.2 km || 
|-id=756 bgcolor=#fefefe
| 275756 ||  || — || July 21, 2001 || Palomar || NEAT || FLO || align=right data-sort-value="0.65" | 650 m || 
|-id=757 bgcolor=#d6d6d6
| 275757 ||  || — || July 23, 2001 || Palomar || NEAT || — || align=right | 5.2 km || 
|-id=758 bgcolor=#fefefe
| 275758 ||  || — || July 17, 2001 || Haleakala || NEAT || V || align=right | 1.1 km || 
|-id=759 bgcolor=#fefefe
| 275759 ||  || — || July 19, 2001 || Haleakala || NEAT || — || align=right | 1.2 km || 
|-id=760 bgcolor=#fefefe
| 275760 ||  || — || July 20, 2001 || Anderson Mesa || LONEOS || — || align=right | 1.5 km || 
|-id=761 bgcolor=#fefefe
| 275761 ||  || — || July 27, 2001 || Palomar || NEAT || FLO || align=right data-sort-value="0.84" | 840 m || 
|-id=762 bgcolor=#d6d6d6
| 275762 ||  || — || July 22, 2001 || Palomar || NEAT || — || align=right | 6.8 km || 
|-id=763 bgcolor=#d6d6d6
| 275763 ||  || — || August 9, 2001 || Palomar || NEAT || — || align=right | 3.5 km || 
|-id=764 bgcolor=#fefefe
| 275764 ||  || — || August 11, 2001 || Haleakala || NEAT || ERI || align=right | 2.9 km || 
|-id=765 bgcolor=#fefefe
| 275765 ||  || — || August 12, 2001 || Eskridge || G. Hug || — || align=right data-sort-value="0.80" | 800 m || 
|-id=766 bgcolor=#fefefe
| 275766 ||  || — || August 10, 2001 || Palomar || NEAT || — || align=right | 1.0 km || 
|-id=767 bgcolor=#fefefe
| 275767 ||  || — || August 10, 2001 || Palomar || NEAT || — || align=right data-sort-value="0.94" | 940 m || 
|-id=768 bgcolor=#fefefe
| 275768 ||  || — || August 10, 2001 || Palomar || NEAT || — || align=right data-sort-value="0.98" | 980 m || 
|-id=769 bgcolor=#fefefe
| 275769 ||  || — || August 11, 2001 || Palomar || NEAT || H || align=right data-sort-value="0.86" | 860 m || 
|-id=770 bgcolor=#d6d6d6
| 275770 ||  || — || August 11, 2001 || Palomar || NEAT || — || align=right | 4.1 km || 
|-id=771 bgcolor=#d6d6d6
| 275771 ||  || — || August 11, 2001 || Palomar || NEAT || — || align=right | 4.5 km || 
|-id=772 bgcolor=#d6d6d6
| 275772 ||  || — || August 11, 2001 || Palomar || NEAT || TIR || align=right | 3.8 km || 
|-id=773 bgcolor=#d6d6d6
| 275773 ||  || — || August 11, 2001 || Palomar || NEAT || — || align=right | 5.4 km || 
|-id=774 bgcolor=#d6d6d6
| 275774 ||  || — || August 13, 2001 || Haleakala || NEAT || — || align=right | 5.1 km || 
|-id=775 bgcolor=#fefefe
| 275775 ||  || — || August 14, 2001 || Haleakala || NEAT || — || align=right data-sort-value="0.87" | 870 m || 
|-id=776 bgcolor=#d6d6d6
| 275776 ||  || — || August 8, 2001 || Haleakala || NEAT || — || align=right | 4.4 km || 
|-id=777 bgcolor=#d6d6d6
| 275777 ||  || — || August 16, 2001 || Socorro || LINEAR || — || align=right | 3.4 km || 
|-id=778 bgcolor=#FA8072
| 275778 ||  || — || August 16, 2001 || Socorro || LINEAR || — || align=right data-sort-value="0.96" | 960 m || 
|-id=779 bgcolor=#fefefe
| 275779 ||  || — || August 16, 2001 || Socorro || LINEAR || — || align=right | 1.3 km || 
|-id=780 bgcolor=#d6d6d6
| 275780 ||  || — || August 16, 2001 || Socorro || LINEAR || THB || align=right | 5.2 km || 
|-id=781 bgcolor=#d6d6d6
| 275781 ||  || — || August 16, 2001 || Socorro || LINEAR || — || align=right | 5.3 km || 
|-id=782 bgcolor=#fefefe
| 275782 ||  || — || August 16, 2001 || Socorro || LINEAR || FLO || align=right data-sort-value="0.77" | 770 m || 
|-id=783 bgcolor=#fefefe
| 275783 ||  || — || August 16, 2001 || Socorro || LINEAR || — || align=right data-sort-value="0.98" | 980 m || 
|-id=784 bgcolor=#d6d6d6
| 275784 ||  || — || August 16, 2001 || Socorro || LINEAR || — || align=right | 4.2 km || 
|-id=785 bgcolor=#d6d6d6
| 275785 ||  || — || August 20, 2001 || Terre Haute || C. Wolfe || ALA || align=right | 4.9 km || 
|-id=786 bgcolor=#fefefe
| 275786 Bouley ||  ||  || August 20, 2001 || Pic du Midi || Pic du Midi Obs. || NYS || align=right data-sort-value="0.76" | 760 m || 
|-id=787 bgcolor=#fefefe
| 275787 ||  || — || August 19, 2001 || Socorro || LINEAR || V || align=right data-sort-value="0.81" | 810 m || 
|-id=788 bgcolor=#d6d6d6
| 275788 ||  || — || August 23, 2001 || Kitt Peak || Spacewatch || HYG || align=right | 3.1 km || 
|-id=789 bgcolor=#fefefe
| 275789 ||  || — || August 17, 2001 || Socorro || LINEAR || — || align=right | 1.9 km || 
|-id=790 bgcolor=#d6d6d6
| 275790 ||  || — || August 20, 2001 || Socorro || LINEAR || — || align=right | 3.4 km || 
|-id=791 bgcolor=#fefefe
| 275791 ||  || — || August 20, 2001 || Socorro || LINEAR || V || align=right data-sort-value="0.99" | 990 m || 
|-id=792 bgcolor=#FFC2E0
| 275792 ||  || — || August 23, 2001 || Socorro || LINEAR || AMO +1km || align=right data-sort-value="0.80" | 800 m || 
|-id=793 bgcolor=#fefefe
| 275793 ||  || — || August 20, 2001 || Haleakala || NEAT || V || align=right data-sort-value="0.97" | 970 m || 
|-id=794 bgcolor=#d6d6d6
| 275794 ||  || — || August 21, 2001 || Palomar || NEAT || EOS || align=right | 3.0 km || 
|-id=795 bgcolor=#fefefe
| 275795 ||  || — || August 24, 2001 || Haleakala || NEAT || V || align=right data-sort-value="0.90" | 900 m || 
|-id=796 bgcolor=#d6d6d6
| 275796 ||  || — || August 25, 2001 || Socorro || LINEAR || — || align=right | 4.2 km || 
|-id=797 bgcolor=#fefefe
| 275797 ||  || — || August 21, 2001 || Kitt Peak || Spacewatch || — || align=right | 1.0 km || 
|-id=798 bgcolor=#fefefe
| 275798 ||  || — || August 25, 2001 || Bergisch Gladbac || W. Bickel || NYS || align=right data-sort-value="0.98" | 980 m || 
|-id=799 bgcolor=#fefefe
| 275799 ||  || — || August 21, 2001 || Kitt Peak || Spacewatch || NYS || align=right data-sort-value="0.67" | 670 m || 
|-id=800 bgcolor=#d6d6d6
| 275800 ||  || — || August 22, 2001 || Palomar || NEAT || EUP || align=right | 4.3 km || 
|}

275801–275900 

|-bgcolor=#fefefe
| 275801 ||  || — || August 23, 2001 || Anderson Mesa || LONEOS || V || align=right | 1.0 km || 
|-id=802 bgcolor=#d6d6d6
| 275802 ||  || — || August 23, 2001 || Anderson Mesa || LONEOS || YAK || align=right | 3.7 km || 
|-id=803 bgcolor=#d6d6d6
| 275803 ||  || — || August 24, 2001 || Anderson Mesa || LONEOS || — || align=right | 3.7 km || 
|-id=804 bgcolor=#E9E9E9
| 275804 ||  || — || August 24, 2001 || Anderson Mesa || LONEOS || — || align=right | 1.4 km || 
|-id=805 bgcolor=#fefefe
| 275805 ||  || — || August 19, 2001 || Socorro || LINEAR || ERI || align=right | 2.3 km || 
|-id=806 bgcolor=#fefefe
| 275806 ||  || — || August 31, 2001 || Palomar || NEAT || NYS || align=right data-sort-value="0.95" | 950 m || 
|-id=807 bgcolor=#d6d6d6
| 275807 ||  || — || August 17, 2001 || Palomar || NEAT || — || align=right | 4.8 km || 
|-id=808 bgcolor=#d6d6d6
| 275808 ||  || — || August 16, 2001 || Palomar || NEAT || EUP || align=right | 3.7 km || 
|-id=809 bgcolor=#C2E0FF
| 275809 ||  || — || August 21, 2001 || Cerro Tololo || M. W. Buie || cubewano (cold)moon || align=right | 320 km || 
|-id=810 bgcolor=#fefefe
| 275810 ||  || — || September 8, 2001 || Socorro || LINEAR || PHO || align=right | 1.7 km || 
|-id=811 bgcolor=#d6d6d6
| 275811 ||  || — || September 8, 2001 || Socorro || LINEAR || Tj (2.99) || align=right | 6.7 km || 
|-id=812 bgcolor=#fefefe
| 275812 ||  || — || September 7, 2001 || Socorro || LINEAR || V || align=right data-sort-value="0.94" | 940 m || 
|-id=813 bgcolor=#d6d6d6
| 275813 ||  || — || September 8, 2001 || Socorro || LINEAR || — || align=right | 4.2 km || 
|-id=814 bgcolor=#d6d6d6
| 275814 ||  || — || September 10, 2001 || Socorro || LINEAR || EUP || align=right | 5.9 km || 
|-id=815 bgcolor=#d6d6d6
| 275815 ||  || — || September 10, 2001 || Socorro || LINEAR || TIR || align=right | 3.1 km || 
|-id=816 bgcolor=#fefefe
| 275816 ||  || — || September 11, 2001 || Desert Eagle || W. K. Y. Yeung || MAS || align=right | 1.1 km || 
|-id=817 bgcolor=#fefefe
| 275817 ||  || — || September 11, 2001 || Desert Eagle || W. K. Y. Yeung || — || align=right | 1.1 km || 
|-id=818 bgcolor=#fefefe
| 275818 ||  || — || September 8, 2001 || Socorro || LINEAR || V || align=right data-sort-value="0.98" | 980 m || 
|-id=819 bgcolor=#fefefe
| 275819 ||  || — || September 8, 2001 || Socorro || LINEAR || — || align=right | 1.2 km || 
|-id=820 bgcolor=#FA8072
| 275820 ||  || — || September 11, 2001 || Socorro || LINEAR || — || align=right | 1.6 km || 
|-id=821 bgcolor=#fefefe
| 275821 ||  || — || September 11, 2001 || Socorro || LINEAR || NYS || align=right data-sort-value="0.84" | 840 m || 
|-id=822 bgcolor=#d6d6d6
| 275822 ||  || — || September 11, 2001 || Socorro || LINEAR || — || align=right | 4.2 km || 
|-id=823 bgcolor=#d6d6d6
| 275823 ||  || — || September 12, 2001 || Socorro || LINEAR || — || align=right | 3.4 km || 
|-id=824 bgcolor=#fefefe
| 275824 ||  || — || September 12, 2001 || Socorro || LINEAR || NYS || align=right data-sort-value="0.84" | 840 m || 
|-id=825 bgcolor=#fefefe
| 275825 ||  || — || September 10, 2001 || Socorro || LINEAR || — || align=right | 1.4 km || 
|-id=826 bgcolor=#d6d6d6
| 275826 ||  || — || September 11, 2001 || Anderson Mesa || LONEOS || — || align=right | 3.8 km || 
|-id=827 bgcolor=#fefefe
| 275827 ||  || — || September 11, 2001 || Anderson Mesa || LONEOS || V || align=right data-sort-value="0.97" | 970 m || 
|-id=828 bgcolor=#fefefe
| 275828 ||  || — || September 11, 2001 || Anderson Mesa || LONEOS || — || align=right | 1.1 km || 
|-id=829 bgcolor=#d6d6d6
| 275829 ||  || — || September 12, 2001 || Socorro || LINEAR || — || align=right | 4.6 km || 
|-id=830 bgcolor=#fefefe
| 275830 ||  || — || September 12, 2001 || Socorro || LINEAR || — || align=right | 1.1 km || 
|-id=831 bgcolor=#fefefe
| 275831 ||  || — || September 12, 2001 || Socorro || LINEAR || — || align=right data-sort-value="0.87" | 870 m || 
|-id=832 bgcolor=#d6d6d6
| 275832 ||  || — || September 12, 2001 || Socorro || LINEAR || THM || align=right | 3.1 km || 
|-id=833 bgcolor=#d6d6d6
| 275833 ||  || — || September 12, 2001 || Socorro || LINEAR || — || align=right | 4.1 km || 
|-id=834 bgcolor=#fefefe
| 275834 ||  || — || September 12, 2001 || Socorro || LINEAR || — || align=right | 1.3 km || 
|-id=835 bgcolor=#fefefe
| 275835 ||  || — || September 12, 2001 || Socorro || LINEAR || EUT || align=right data-sort-value="0.82" | 820 m || 
|-id=836 bgcolor=#fefefe
| 275836 ||  || — || September 12, 2001 || Socorro || LINEAR || NYS || align=right data-sort-value="0.90" | 900 m || 
|-id=837 bgcolor=#fefefe
| 275837 ||  || — || September 12, 2001 || Socorro || LINEAR || MAS || align=right data-sort-value="0.86" | 860 m || 
|-id=838 bgcolor=#fefefe
| 275838 ||  || — || September 12, 2001 || Socorro || LINEAR || H || align=right data-sort-value="0.83" | 830 m || 
|-id=839 bgcolor=#d6d6d6
| 275839 ||  || — || September 8, 2001 || Anderson Mesa || LONEOS || — || align=right | 4.3 km || 
|-id=840 bgcolor=#fefefe
| 275840 ||  || — || September 11, 2001 || Anderson Mesa || LONEOS || — || align=right | 2.0 km || 
|-id=841 bgcolor=#E9E9E9
| 275841 ||  || — || September 17, 2001 || Goodricke-Pigott || R. A. Tucker || MRX || align=right | 1.4 km || 
|-id=842 bgcolor=#FA8072
| 275842 ||  || — || September 17, 2001 || Socorro || LINEAR || — || align=right | 1.9 km || 
|-id=843 bgcolor=#fefefe
| 275843 ||  || — || September 16, 2001 || Socorro || LINEAR || V || align=right data-sort-value="0.98" | 980 m || 
|-id=844 bgcolor=#E9E9E9
| 275844 ||  || — || September 16, 2001 || Socorro || LINEAR || — || align=right | 1.0 km || 
|-id=845 bgcolor=#fefefe
| 275845 ||  || — || September 16, 2001 || Socorro || LINEAR || MAS || align=right data-sort-value="0.97" | 970 m || 
|-id=846 bgcolor=#fefefe
| 275846 ||  || — || September 16, 2001 || Socorro || LINEAR || EUT || align=right data-sort-value="0.92" | 920 m || 
|-id=847 bgcolor=#FA8072
| 275847 ||  || — || September 17, 2001 || Socorro || LINEAR || — || align=right | 1.6 km || 
|-id=848 bgcolor=#fefefe
| 275848 ||  || — || September 16, 2001 || Socorro || LINEAR || — || align=right data-sort-value="0.87" | 870 m || 
|-id=849 bgcolor=#fefefe
| 275849 ||  || — || September 20, 2001 || Socorro || LINEAR || — || align=right | 1.0 km || 
|-id=850 bgcolor=#E9E9E9
| 275850 ||  || — || September 20, 2001 || Socorro || LINEAR || — || align=right | 1.0 km || 
|-id=851 bgcolor=#d6d6d6
| 275851 ||  || — || September 20, 2001 || Socorro || LINEAR || — || align=right | 4.7 km || 
|-id=852 bgcolor=#fefefe
| 275852 ||  || — || September 20, 2001 || Socorro || LINEAR || V || align=right | 1.0 km || 
|-id=853 bgcolor=#d6d6d6
| 275853 ||  || — || September 20, 2001 || Desert Eagle || W. K. Y. Yeung || — || align=right | 3.7 km || 
|-id=854 bgcolor=#fefefe
| 275854 ||  || — || September 16, 2001 || Socorro || LINEAR || V || align=right data-sort-value="0.96" | 960 m || 
|-id=855 bgcolor=#d6d6d6
| 275855 ||  || — || September 16, 2001 || Socorro || LINEAR || — || align=right | 4.9 km || 
|-id=856 bgcolor=#fefefe
| 275856 ||  || — || September 16, 2001 || Socorro || LINEAR || — || align=right | 1.3 km || 
|-id=857 bgcolor=#fefefe
| 275857 ||  || — || September 16, 2001 || Socorro || LINEAR || V || align=right data-sort-value="0.91" | 910 m || 
|-id=858 bgcolor=#fefefe
| 275858 ||  || — || September 16, 2001 || Socorro || LINEAR || V || align=right | 1.1 km || 
|-id=859 bgcolor=#d6d6d6
| 275859 ||  || — || September 17, 2001 || Socorro || LINEAR || Tj (2.98) || align=right | 3.9 km || 
|-id=860 bgcolor=#E9E9E9
| 275860 ||  || — || September 17, 2001 || Socorro || LINEAR || — || align=right | 3.2 km || 
|-id=861 bgcolor=#fefefe
| 275861 ||  || — || September 17, 2001 || Socorro || LINEAR || MAS || align=right data-sort-value="0.98" | 980 m || 
|-id=862 bgcolor=#fefefe
| 275862 ||  || — || September 16, 2001 || Socorro || LINEAR || — || align=right | 1.2 km || 
|-id=863 bgcolor=#fefefe
| 275863 ||  || — || September 16, 2001 || Socorro || LINEAR || NYS || align=right data-sort-value="0.90" | 900 m || 
|-id=864 bgcolor=#fefefe
| 275864 ||  || — || September 16, 2001 || Socorro || LINEAR || MAS || align=right | 1.1 km || 
|-id=865 bgcolor=#fefefe
| 275865 ||  || — || September 19, 2001 || Socorro || LINEAR || — || align=right data-sort-value="0.98" | 980 m || 
|-id=866 bgcolor=#fefefe
| 275866 ||  || — || September 19, 2001 || Socorro || LINEAR || — || align=right | 1.2 km || 
|-id=867 bgcolor=#fefefe
| 275867 ||  || — || September 19, 2001 || Socorro || LINEAR || EUT || align=right data-sort-value="0.69" | 690 m || 
|-id=868 bgcolor=#fefefe
| 275868 ||  || — || September 19, 2001 || Socorro || LINEAR || — || align=right | 1.4 km || 
|-id=869 bgcolor=#E9E9E9
| 275869 ||  || — || September 19, 2001 || Socorro || LINEAR || — || align=right data-sort-value="0.91" | 910 m || 
|-id=870 bgcolor=#fefefe
| 275870 ||  || — || September 19, 2001 || Socorro || LINEAR || MAS || align=right data-sort-value="0.73" | 730 m || 
|-id=871 bgcolor=#fefefe
| 275871 ||  || — || September 19, 2001 || Socorro || LINEAR || — || align=right data-sort-value="0.94" | 940 m || 
|-id=872 bgcolor=#E9E9E9
| 275872 ||  || — || September 19, 2001 || Socorro || LINEAR || GEF || align=right | 1.3 km || 
|-id=873 bgcolor=#fefefe
| 275873 ||  || — || September 19, 2001 || Socorro || LINEAR || — || align=right data-sort-value="0.86" | 860 m || 
|-id=874 bgcolor=#fefefe
| 275874 ||  || — || September 20, 2001 || Socorro || LINEAR || — || align=right data-sort-value="0.84" | 840 m || 
|-id=875 bgcolor=#fefefe
| 275875 ||  || — || September 25, 2001 || Socorro || LINEAR || H || align=right data-sort-value="0.60" | 600 m || 
|-id=876 bgcolor=#E9E9E9
| 275876 ||  || — || September 16, 2001 || Socorro || LINEAR || — || align=right | 1.7 km || 
|-id=877 bgcolor=#fefefe
| 275877 ||  || — || September 20, 2001 || Socorro || LINEAR || — || align=right | 1.1 km || 
|-id=878 bgcolor=#fefefe
| 275878 ||  || — || September 20, 2001 || Socorro || LINEAR || — || align=right | 1.0 km || 
|-id=879 bgcolor=#E9E9E9
| 275879 ||  || — || September 16, 2001 || Socorro || LINEAR || — || align=right | 1.3 km || 
|-id=880 bgcolor=#E9E9E9
| 275880 ||  || — || September 23, 2001 || Haleakala || NEAT || — || align=right | 1.2 km || 
|-id=881 bgcolor=#E9E9E9
| 275881 ||  || — || April 10, 2003 || Kitt Peak || Spacewatch || — || align=right | 1.0 km || 
|-id=882 bgcolor=#fefefe
| 275882 ||  || — || October 10, 2001 || Palomar || NEAT || FLO || align=right data-sort-value="0.85" | 850 m || 
|-id=883 bgcolor=#fefefe
| 275883 ||  || — || October 11, 2001 || Socorro || LINEAR || — || align=right | 1.1 km || 
|-id=884 bgcolor=#E9E9E9
| 275884 ||  || — || October 13, 2001 || Socorro || LINEAR || — || align=right | 1.3 km || 
|-id=885 bgcolor=#fefefe
| 275885 ||  || — || October 14, 2001 || Socorro || LINEAR || NYS || align=right data-sort-value="0.90" | 900 m || 
|-id=886 bgcolor=#E9E9E9
| 275886 ||  || — || October 14, 2001 || Socorro || LINEAR || GAL || align=right | 2.1 km || 
|-id=887 bgcolor=#E9E9E9
| 275887 ||  || — || October 14, 2001 || Socorro || LINEAR || — || align=right | 2.9 km || 
|-id=888 bgcolor=#E9E9E9
| 275888 ||  || — || October 14, 2001 || Socorro || LINEAR || — || align=right | 3.4 km || 
|-id=889 bgcolor=#E9E9E9
| 275889 ||  || — || October 14, 2001 || Cima Ekar || ADAS || — || align=right | 1.4 km || 
|-id=890 bgcolor=#fefefe
| 275890 ||  || — || October 14, 2001 || Socorro || LINEAR || — || align=right | 1.4 km || 
|-id=891 bgcolor=#fefefe
| 275891 ||  || — || October 13, 2001 || Socorro || LINEAR || — || align=right | 1.3 km || 
|-id=892 bgcolor=#fefefe
| 275892 ||  || — || October 13, 2001 || Socorro || LINEAR || V || align=right data-sort-value="0.99" | 990 m || 
|-id=893 bgcolor=#d6d6d6
| 275893 ||  || — || October 13, 2001 || Socorro || LINEAR || EUP || align=right | 3.8 km || 
|-id=894 bgcolor=#fefefe
| 275894 ||  || — || October 13, 2001 || Socorro || LINEAR || NYS || align=right data-sort-value="0.88" | 880 m || 
|-id=895 bgcolor=#d6d6d6
| 275895 ||  || — || October 13, 2001 || Socorro || LINEAR || HYG || align=right | 3.7 km || 
|-id=896 bgcolor=#fefefe
| 275896 ||  || — || October 13, 2001 || Socorro || LINEAR || V || align=right | 1.1 km || 
|-id=897 bgcolor=#fefefe
| 275897 ||  || — || October 13, 2001 || Socorro || LINEAR || NYS || align=right | 2.5 km || 
|-id=898 bgcolor=#E9E9E9
| 275898 ||  || — || October 14, 2001 || Socorro || LINEAR || — || align=right | 1.4 km || 
|-id=899 bgcolor=#fefefe
| 275899 ||  || — || October 14, 2001 || Socorro || LINEAR || V || align=right data-sort-value="0.99" | 990 m || 
|-id=900 bgcolor=#fefefe
| 275900 ||  || — || October 14, 2001 || Socorro || LINEAR || V || align=right data-sort-value="0.82" | 820 m || 
|}

275901–276000 

|-bgcolor=#E9E9E9
| 275901 ||  || — || October 14, 2001 || Socorro || LINEAR || — || align=right | 1.1 km || 
|-id=902 bgcolor=#fefefe
| 275902 ||  || — || October 14, 2001 || Socorro || LINEAR || — || align=right data-sort-value="0.82" | 820 m || 
|-id=903 bgcolor=#d6d6d6
| 275903 ||  || — || October 14, 2001 || Socorro || LINEAR || — || align=right | 4.7 km || 
|-id=904 bgcolor=#E9E9E9
| 275904 ||  || — || October 15, 2001 || Socorro || LINEAR || — || align=right | 1.4 km || 
|-id=905 bgcolor=#E9E9E9
| 275905 ||  || — || October 14, 2001 || Socorro || LINEAR || — || align=right | 1.1 km || 
|-id=906 bgcolor=#E9E9E9
| 275906 ||  || — || October 12, 2001 || Haleakala || NEAT || — || align=right | 1.2 km || 
|-id=907 bgcolor=#fefefe
| 275907 ||  || — || October 10, 2001 || Palomar || NEAT || NYS || align=right data-sort-value="0.86" | 860 m || 
|-id=908 bgcolor=#fefefe
| 275908 ||  || — || October 10, 2001 || Palomar || NEAT || — || align=right | 1.2 km || 
|-id=909 bgcolor=#d6d6d6
| 275909 ||  || — || October 10, 2001 || Palomar || NEAT || HYG || align=right | 4.4 km || 
|-id=910 bgcolor=#E9E9E9
| 275910 ||  || — || October 10, 2001 || Palomar || NEAT || — || align=right | 2.6 km || 
|-id=911 bgcolor=#fefefe
| 275911 ||  || — || October 10, 2001 || Palomar || NEAT || NYS || align=right | 1.2 km || 
|-id=912 bgcolor=#E9E9E9
| 275912 ||  || — || October 10, 2001 || Palomar || NEAT || — || align=right | 1.3 km || 
|-id=913 bgcolor=#fefefe
| 275913 ||  || — || October 10, 2001 || Palomar || NEAT || — || align=right | 1.5 km || 
|-id=914 bgcolor=#fefefe
| 275914 ||  || — || October 15, 2001 || Palomar || NEAT || — || align=right | 3.1 km || 
|-id=915 bgcolor=#E9E9E9
| 275915 ||  || — || October 15, 2001 || Haleakala || NEAT || — || align=right | 2.0 km || 
|-id=916 bgcolor=#fefefe
| 275916 ||  || — || October 14, 2001 || Socorro || LINEAR || V || align=right data-sort-value="0.93" | 930 m || 
|-id=917 bgcolor=#d6d6d6
| 275917 ||  || — || October 14, 2001 || Socorro || LINEAR || 7:4 || align=right | 6.0 km || 
|-id=918 bgcolor=#fefefe
| 275918 ||  || — || October 14, 2001 || Socorro || LINEAR || — || align=right | 1.2 km || 
|-id=919 bgcolor=#fefefe
| 275919 ||  || — || October 14, 2001 || Socorro || LINEAR || V || align=right data-sort-value="0.90" | 900 m || 
|-id=920 bgcolor=#E9E9E9
| 275920 ||  || — || October 14, 2001 || Socorro || LINEAR || — || align=right | 1.0 km || 
|-id=921 bgcolor=#E9E9E9
| 275921 ||  || — || October 11, 2001 || Socorro || LINEAR || — || align=right | 3.1 km || 
|-id=922 bgcolor=#E9E9E9
| 275922 ||  || — || October 11, 2001 || Socorro || LINEAR || — || align=right | 3.2 km || 
|-id=923 bgcolor=#fefefe
| 275923 ||  || — || October 11, 2001 || Socorro || LINEAR || — || align=right data-sort-value="0.78" | 780 m || 
|-id=924 bgcolor=#fefefe
| 275924 ||  || — || October 14, 2001 || Palomar || NEAT || — || align=right | 1.3 km || 
|-id=925 bgcolor=#E9E9E9
| 275925 ||  || — || October 15, 2001 || Socorro || LINEAR || ADE || align=right | 3.1 km || 
|-id=926 bgcolor=#E9E9E9
| 275926 ||  || — || October 11, 2001 || Palomar || NEAT || — || align=right data-sort-value="0.91" | 910 m || 
|-id=927 bgcolor=#d6d6d6
| 275927 ||  || — || October 14, 2001 || Anderson Mesa || LONEOS || LIX || align=right | 5.2 km || 
|-id=928 bgcolor=#fefefe
| 275928 ||  || — || October 14, 2001 || Socorro || LINEAR || V || align=right data-sort-value="0.90" | 900 m || 
|-id=929 bgcolor=#fefefe
| 275929 ||  || — || October 10, 2001 || Palomar || NEAT || — || align=right | 1.2 km || 
|-id=930 bgcolor=#E9E9E9
| 275930 ||  || — || October 23, 2001 || Kitt Peak || Spacewatch || — || align=right | 2.7 km || 
|-id=931 bgcolor=#E9E9E9
| 275931 ||  || — || October 17, 2001 || Socorro || LINEAR || — || align=right | 1.7 km || 
|-id=932 bgcolor=#fefefe
| 275932 ||  || — || October 16, 2001 || Socorro || LINEAR || — || align=right data-sort-value="0.94" | 940 m || 
|-id=933 bgcolor=#E9E9E9
| 275933 ||  || — || October 17, 2001 || Socorro || LINEAR || GEF || align=right | 1.6 km || 
|-id=934 bgcolor=#fefefe
| 275934 ||  || — || October 17, 2001 || Socorro || LINEAR || H || align=right data-sort-value="0.82" | 820 m || 
|-id=935 bgcolor=#E9E9E9
| 275935 ||  || — || October 17, 2001 || Socorro || LINEAR || — || align=right | 1.1 km || 
|-id=936 bgcolor=#E9E9E9
| 275936 ||  || — || October 17, 2001 || Socorro || LINEAR || — || align=right | 1.0 km || 
|-id=937 bgcolor=#fefefe
| 275937 ||  || — || October 18, 2001 || Socorro || LINEAR || — || align=right | 1.3 km || 
|-id=938 bgcolor=#E9E9E9
| 275938 ||  || — || October 20, 2001 || Socorro || LINEAR || — || align=right | 1.3 km || 
|-id=939 bgcolor=#fefefe
| 275939 ||  || — || October 18, 2001 || Palomar || NEAT || — || align=right | 1.2 km || 
|-id=940 bgcolor=#d6d6d6
| 275940 ||  || — || October 20, 2001 || Socorro || LINEAR || — || align=right | 3.6 km || 
|-id=941 bgcolor=#E9E9E9
| 275941 ||  || — || October 22, 2001 || Palomar || NEAT || — || align=right | 1.1 km || 
|-id=942 bgcolor=#E9E9E9
| 275942 ||  || — || October 20, 2001 || Socorro || LINEAR || — || align=right | 1.5 km || 
|-id=943 bgcolor=#E9E9E9
| 275943 ||  || — || October 23, 2001 || Socorro || LINEAR || — || align=right | 2.2 km || 
|-id=944 bgcolor=#E9E9E9
| 275944 ||  || — || October 23, 2001 || Socorro || LINEAR || — || align=right | 2.2 km || 
|-id=945 bgcolor=#d6d6d6
| 275945 ||  || — || October 23, 2001 || Socorro || LINEAR || EUP || align=right | 4.3 km || 
|-id=946 bgcolor=#E9E9E9
| 275946 ||  || — || October 21, 2001 || Socorro || LINEAR || — || align=right | 1.9 km || 
|-id=947 bgcolor=#fefefe
| 275947 ||  || — || October 16, 2001 || Socorro || LINEAR || SUL || align=right | 3.0 km || 
|-id=948 bgcolor=#d6d6d6
| 275948 ||  || — || October 17, 2001 || Socorro || LINEAR || EUP || align=right | 6.0 km || 
|-id=949 bgcolor=#fefefe
| 275949 ||  || — || October 17, 2001 || Socorro || LINEAR || — || align=right | 1.3 km || 
|-id=950 bgcolor=#fefefe
| 275950 ||  || — || October 16, 2001 || Palomar || NEAT || — || align=right data-sort-value="0.68" | 680 m || 
|-id=951 bgcolor=#d6d6d6
| 275951 ||  || — || November 6, 2001 || Socorro || LINEAR || EUP || align=right | 4.5 km || 
|-id=952 bgcolor=#fefefe
| 275952 ||  || — || November 11, 2001 || Kitt Peak || Spacewatch || FLO || align=right data-sort-value="0.82" | 820 m || 
|-id=953 bgcolor=#E9E9E9
| 275953 ||  || — || November 10, 2001 || Socorro || LINEAR || — || align=right | 1.0 km || 
|-id=954 bgcolor=#E9E9E9
| 275954 ||  || — || November 11, 2001 || Socorro || LINEAR || KRM || align=right | 2.6 km || 
|-id=955 bgcolor=#fefefe
| 275955 ||  || — || November 11, 2001 || Socorro || LINEAR || NYS || align=right | 1.2 km || 
|-id=956 bgcolor=#E9E9E9
| 275956 ||  || — || November 15, 2001 || Socorro || LINEAR || — || align=right | 3.2 km || 
|-id=957 bgcolor=#E9E9E9
| 275957 ||  || — || November 12, 2001 || Anderson Mesa || LONEOS || — || align=right | 1.4 km || 
|-id=958 bgcolor=#E9E9E9
| 275958 ||  || — || November 12, 2001 || Socorro || LINEAR || — || align=right | 1.1 km || 
|-id=959 bgcolor=#E9E9E9
| 275959 ||  || — || November 14, 2001 || Kitt Peak || Spacewatch || — || align=right data-sort-value="0.89" | 890 m || 
|-id=960 bgcolor=#fefefe
| 275960 ||  || — || November 11, 2001 || Apache Point || SDSS || — || align=right | 1.0 km || 
|-id=961 bgcolor=#fefefe
| 275961 ||  || — || November 11, 2001 || Apache Point || SDSS || — || align=right data-sort-value="0.91" | 910 m || 
|-id=962 bgcolor=#E9E9E9
| 275962 Chalverat ||  ||  || November 21, 2001 || Vicques || M. Ory || — || align=right | 1.2 km || 
|-id=963 bgcolor=#E9E9E9
| 275963 ||  || — || November 17, 2001 || Socorro || LINEAR || — || align=right | 2.0 km || 
|-id=964 bgcolor=#fefefe
| 275964 ||  || — || November 17, 2001 || Socorro || LINEAR || V || align=right | 1.0 km || 
|-id=965 bgcolor=#fefefe
| 275965 ||  || — || November 17, 2001 || Socorro || LINEAR || — || align=right | 1.7 km || 
|-id=966 bgcolor=#E9E9E9
| 275966 ||  || — || November 17, 2001 || Socorro || LINEAR || — || align=right | 1.6 km || 
|-id=967 bgcolor=#fefefe
| 275967 ||  || — || November 17, 2001 || Socorro || LINEAR || — || align=right | 1.5 km || 
|-id=968 bgcolor=#E9E9E9
| 275968 ||  || — || November 17, 2001 || Socorro || LINEAR || — || align=right | 3.6 km || 
|-id=969 bgcolor=#fefefe
| 275969 ||  || — || November 19, 2001 || Socorro || LINEAR || — || align=right | 1.4 km || 
|-id=970 bgcolor=#fefefe
| 275970 ||  || — || November 20, 2001 || Socorro || LINEAR || — || align=right | 1.1 km || 
|-id=971 bgcolor=#fefefe
| 275971 ||  || — || November 21, 2001 || Socorro || LINEAR || — || align=right | 1.3 km || 
|-id=972 bgcolor=#fefefe
| 275972 ||  || — || November 18, 2001 || Haleakala || NEAT || LCI || align=right | 1.1 km || 
|-id=973 bgcolor=#E9E9E9
| 275973 ||  || — || November 21, 2001 || Apache Point || SDSS || — || align=right | 1.6 km || 
|-id=974 bgcolor=#FFC2E0
| 275974 ||  || — || December 2, 2001 || Palomar || NEAT || APOcritical || align=right data-sort-value="0.63" | 630 m || 
|-id=975 bgcolor=#FFC2E0
| 275975 ||  || — || December 7, 2001 || Socorro || LINEAR || APO || align=right data-sort-value="0.46" | 460 m || 
|-id=976 bgcolor=#FFC2E0
| 275976 ||  || — || December 9, 2001 || Socorro || LINEAR || APO +1km || align=right | 2.4 km || 
|-id=977 bgcolor=#fefefe
| 275977 ||  || — || December 10, 2001 || Socorro || LINEAR || — || align=right | 2.1 km || 
|-id=978 bgcolor=#E9E9E9
| 275978 ||  || — || December 9, 2001 || Socorro || LINEAR || — || align=right | 1.8 km || 
|-id=979 bgcolor=#fefefe
| 275979 ||  || — || December 10, 2001 || Socorro || LINEAR || H || align=right | 1.5 km || 
|-id=980 bgcolor=#E9E9E9
| 275980 ||  || — || December 10, 2001 || Socorro || LINEAR || — || align=right | 1.7 km || 
|-id=981 bgcolor=#fefefe
| 275981 ||  || — || December 11, 2001 || Socorro || LINEAR || — || align=right | 1.3 km || 
|-id=982 bgcolor=#fefefe
| 275982 ||  || — || December 11, 2001 || Socorro || LINEAR || — || align=right | 1.5 km || 
|-id=983 bgcolor=#E9E9E9
| 275983 ||  || — || December 11, 2001 || Socorro || LINEAR || — || align=right | 1.4 km || 
|-id=984 bgcolor=#E9E9E9
| 275984 ||  || — || December 11, 2001 || Socorro || LINEAR || — || align=right | 1.3 km || 
|-id=985 bgcolor=#fefefe
| 275985 ||  || — || December 10, 2001 || Socorro || LINEAR || V || align=right | 1.1 km || 
|-id=986 bgcolor=#E9E9E9
| 275986 ||  || — || December 10, 2001 || Socorro || LINEAR || — || align=right | 1.5 km || 
|-id=987 bgcolor=#E9E9E9
| 275987 ||  || — || December 10, 2001 || Socorro || LINEAR || HEN || align=right | 1.4 km || 
|-id=988 bgcolor=#E9E9E9
| 275988 ||  || — || December 10, 2001 || Socorro || LINEAR || — || align=right | 1.7 km || 
|-id=989 bgcolor=#fefefe
| 275989 ||  || — || December 11, 2001 || Socorro || LINEAR || — || align=right | 1.2 km || 
|-id=990 bgcolor=#E9E9E9
| 275990 ||  || — || December 14, 2001 || Socorro || LINEAR || — || align=right | 2.2 km || 
|-id=991 bgcolor=#fefefe
| 275991 ||  || — || December 14, 2001 || Socorro || LINEAR || NYS || align=right data-sort-value="0.86" | 860 m || 
|-id=992 bgcolor=#fefefe
| 275992 ||  || — || December 14, 2001 || Socorro || LINEAR || FLO || align=right | 1.1 km || 
|-id=993 bgcolor=#d6d6d6
| 275993 ||  || — || December 14, 2001 || Socorro || LINEAR || HIL3:2 || align=right | 3.7 km || 
|-id=994 bgcolor=#E9E9E9
| 275994 ||  || — || December 14, 2001 || Socorro || LINEAR || — || align=right | 1.2 km || 
|-id=995 bgcolor=#E9E9E9
| 275995 ||  || — || December 14, 2001 || Socorro || LINEAR || — || align=right | 1.6 km || 
|-id=996 bgcolor=#E9E9E9
| 275996 ||  || — || December 14, 2001 || Socorro || LINEAR || — || align=right | 1.8 km || 
|-id=997 bgcolor=#E9E9E9
| 275997 ||  || — || December 14, 2001 || Socorro || LINEAR || — || align=right | 2.9 km || 
|-id=998 bgcolor=#E9E9E9
| 275998 ||  || — || December 11, 2001 || Socorro || LINEAR || — || align=right | 1.8 km || 
|-id=999 bgcolor=#E9E9E9
| 275999 ||  || — || December 15, 2001 || Socorro || LINEAR || — || align=right | 3.0 km || 
|-id=000 bgcolor=#E9E9E9
| 276000 ||  || — || December 15, 2001 || Socorro || LINEAR || — || align=right | 1.6 km || 
|}

References

External links 
 Discovery Circumstances: Numbered Minor Planets (275001)–(280000) (IAU Minor Planet Center)

0275